

294001–294100 

|-bgcolor=#fefefe
| 294001 ||  || — || October 8, 2007 || Mount Lemmon || Mount Lemmon Survey || — || align=right data-sort-value="0.91" | 910 m || 
|-id=002 bgcolor=#E9E9E9
| 294002 ||  || — || October 8, 2007 || Kitt Peak || Spacewatch || HNS || align=right | 1.9 km || 
|-id=003 bgcolor=#E9E9E9
| 294003 ||  || — || April 17, 1996 || Kitt Peak || Spacewatch || HOF || align=right | 3.5 km || 
|-id=004 bgcolor=#E9E9E9
| 294004 ||  || — || October 6, 2007 || Kitt Peak || Spacewatch || — || align=right | 1.1 km || 
|-id=005 bgcolor=#d6d6d6
| 294005 ||  || — || October 7, 2007 || Catalina || CSS || — || align=right | 4.1 km || 
|-id=006 bgcolor=#E9E9E9
| 294006 ||  || — || October 7, 2007 || Catalina || CSS || — || align=right | 1.7 km || 
|-id=007 bgcolor=#E9E9E9
| 294007 ||  || — || October 7, 2007 || Catalina || CSS || fast? || align=right | 4.0 km || 
|-id=008 bgcolor=#E9E9E9
| 294008 ||  || — || October 7, 2007 || Catalina || CSS || EUN || align=right | 1.7 km || 
|-id=009 bgcolor=#d6d6d6
| 294009 ||  || — || October 7, 2007 || Kitt Peak || Spacewatch || TIR || align=right | 3.6 km || 
|-id=010 bgcolor=#d6d6d6
| 294010 ||  || — || October 7, 2007 || Kitt Peak || Spacewatch || — || align=right | 2.9 km || 
|-id=011 bgcolor=#E9E9E9
| 294011 ||  || — || October 8, 2007 || Mount Lemmon || Mount Lemmon Survey || — || align=right | 1.5 km || 
|-id=012 bgcolor=#fefefe
| 294012 ||  || — || October 8, 2007 || Mount Lemmon || Mount Lemmon Survey || — || align=right data-sort-value="0.74" | 740 m || 
|-id=013 bgcolor=#fefefe
| 294013 ||  || — || October 8, 2007 || Mount Lemmon || Mount Lemmon Survey || — || align=right data-sort-value="0.73" | 730 m || 
|-id=014 bgcolor=#E9E9E9
| 294014 ||  || — || October 8, 2007 || Mount Lemmon || Mount Lemmon Survey || — || align=right | 1.2 km || 
|-id=015 bgcolor=#d6d6d6
| 294015 ||  || — || October 8, 2007 || Mount Lemmon || Mount Lemmon Survey || — || align=right | 4.3 km || 
|-id=016 bgcolor=#fefefe
| 294016 ||  || — || October 7, 2007 || Catalina || CSS || FLO || align=right data-sort-value="0.82" | 820 m || 
|-id=017 bgcolor=#fefefe
| 294017 ||  || — || October 7, 2007 || Catalina || CSS || FLO || align=right data-sort-value="0.81" | 810 m || 
|-id=018 bgcolor=#E9E9E9
| 294018 ||  || — || October 8, 2007 || Catalina || CSS || — || align=right | 3.4 km || 
|-id=019 bgcolor=#E9E9E9
| 294019 ||  || — || October 8, 2007 || Catalina || CSS || KAZ || align=right | 1.2 km || 
|-id=020 bgcolor=#fefefe
| 294020 ||  || — || October 8, 2007 || Anderson Mesa || LONEOS || FLO || align=right data-sort-value="0.96" | 960 m || 
|-id=021 bgcolor=#E9E9E9
| 294021 ||  || — || October 8, 2007 || Catalina || CSS || — || align=right | 3.9 km || 
|-id=022 bgcolor=#d6d6d6
| 294022 ||  || — || October 6, 2007 || Kitt Peak || Spacewatch || — || align=right | 3.5 km || 
|-id=023 bgcolor=#fefefe
| 294023 ||  || — || October 6, 2007 || Kitt Peak || Spacewatch || — || align=right data-sort-value="0.73" | 730 m || 
|-id=024 bgcolor=#E9E9E9
| 294024 ||  || — || October 6, 2007 || Kitt Peak || Spacewatch || — || align=right | 1.1 km || 
|-id=025 bgcolor=#E9E9E9
| 294025 ||  || — || October 6, 2007 || Kitt Peak || Spacewatch || — || align=right | 2.4 km || 
|-id=026 bgcolor=#E9E9E9
| 294026 ||  || — || October 6, 2007 || Kitt Peak || Spacewatch || JUN || align=right | 1.3 km || 
|-id=027 bgcolor=#E9E9E9
| 294027 ||  || — || October 6, 2007 || Kitt Peak || Spacewatch || — || align=right | 2.1 km || 
|-id=028 bgcolor=#fefefe
| 294028 ||  || — || October 6, 2007 || Kitt Peak || Spacewatch || MAS || align=right data-sort-value="0.97" | 970 m || 
|-id=029 bgcolor=#E9E9E9
| 294029 ||  || — || October 6, 2007 || Kitt Peak || Spacewatch || NEM || align=right | 3.2 km || 
|-id=030 bgcolor=#E9E9E9
| 294030 ||  || — || October 6, 2007 || Kitt Peak || Spacewatch || — || align=right | 1.7 km || 
|-id=031 bgcolor=#fefefe
| 294031 ||  || — || October 6, 2007 || Kitt Peak || Spacewatch || — || align=right data-sort-value="0.72" | 720 m || 
|-id=032 bgcolor=#E9E9E9
| 294032 ||  || — || October 6, 2007 || Kitt Peak || Spacewatch || — || align=right | 1.9 km || 
|-id=033 bgcolor=#E9E9E9
| 294033 ||  || — || October 6, 2007 || Kitt Peak || Spacewatch || — || align=right | 1.8 km || 
|-id=034 bgcolor=#fefefe
| 294034 ||  || — || October 6, 2007 || Kitt Peak || Spacewatch || — || align=right data-sort-value="0.83" | 830 m || 
|-id=035 bgcolor=#fefefe
| 294035 ||  || — || October 6, 2007 || Kitt Peak || Spacewatch || V || align=right data-sort-value="0.74" | 740 m || 
|-id=036 bgcolor=#E9E9E9
| 294036 ||  || — || October 7, 2007 || Kitt Peak || Spacewatch || — || align=right | 1.1 km || 
|-id=037 bgcolor=#E9E9E9
| 294037 ||  || — || October 7, 2007 || Mount Lemmon || Mount Lemmon Survey || — || align=right | 2.6 km || 
|-id=038 bgcolor=#E9E9E9
| 294038 ||  || — || October 7, 2007 || Mount Lemmon || Mount Lemmon Survey || GEF || align=right | 1.3 km || 
|-id=039 bgcolor=#d6d6d6
| 294039 ||  || — || October 7, 2007 || Mount Lemmon || Mount Lemmon Survey || K-2 || align=right | 1.5 km || 
|-id=040 bgcolor=#fefefe
| 294040 ||  || — || October 7, 2007 || Mount Lemmon || Mount Lemmon Survey || — || align=right data-sort-value="0.71" | 710 m || 
|-id=041 bgcolor=#E9E9E9
| 294041 ||  || — || October 7, 2007 || Mount Lemmon || Mount Lemmon Survey || EUN || align=right | 2.5 km || 
|-id=042 bgcolor=#E9E9E9
| 294042 ||  || — || October 8, 2007 || Kitt Peak || Spacewatch || — || align=right | 2.8 km || 
|-id=043 bgcolor=#d6d6d6
| 294043 ||  || — || October 8, 2007 || Kitt Peak || Spacewatch || LIX || align=right | 4.2 km || 
|-id=044 bgcolor=#d6d6d6
| 294044 ||  || — || October 9, 2007 || Catalina || CSS || — || align=right | 4.4 km || 
|-id=045 bgcolor=#fefefe
| 294045 ||  || — || October 9, 2007 || Mount Lemmon || Mount Lemmon Survey || ERI || align=right | 1.8 km || 
|-id=046 bgcolor=#E9E9E9
| 294046 ||  || — || October 9, 2007 || Mount Lemmon || Mount Lemmon Survey || — || align=right | 1.7 km || 
|-id=047 bgcolor=#fefefe
| 294047 ||  || — || October 15, 2007 || Dauban || Chante-Perdrix Obs. || V || align=right data-sort-value="0.70" | 700 m || 
|-id=048 bgcolor=#E9E9E9
| 294048 ||  || — || October 6, 2007 || Socorro || LINEAR || — || align=right | 1.8 km || 
|-id=049 bgcolor=#fefefe
| 294049 ||  || — || October 7, 2007 || Socorro || LINEAR || MAS || align=right | 1.0 km || 
|-id=050 bgcolor=#fefefe
| 294050 ||  || — || October 9, 2007 || Socorro || LINEAR || — || align=right | 1.1 km || 
|-id=051 bgcolor=#fefefe
| 294051 ||  || — || October 9, 2007 || Socorro || LINEAR || — || align=right data-sort-value="0.92" | 920 m || 
|-id=052 bgcolor=#fefefe
| 294052 ||  || — || October 9, 2007 || Socorro || LINEAR || — || align=right | 1.3 km || 
|-id=053 bgcolor=#E9E9E9
| 294053 ||  || — || October 9, 2007 || Socorro || LINEAR || — || align=right data-sort-value="0.92" | 920 m || 
|-id=054 bgcolor=#E9E9E9
| 294054 ||  || — || October 9, 2007 || Socorro || LINEAR || — || align=right | 1.9 km || 
|-id=055 bgcolor=#d6d6d6
| 294055 ||  || — || October 9, 2007 || Socorro || LINEAR || — || align=right | 3.9 km || 
|-id=056 bgcolor=#d6d6d6
| 294056 ||  || — || October 9, 2007 || Socorro || LINEAR || TEL || align=right | 1.9 km || 
|-id=057 bgcolor=#fefefe
| 294057 ||  || — || October 9, 2007 || Socorro || LINEAR || ERI || align=right | 1.9 km || 
|-id=058 bgcolor=#E9E9E9
| 294058 ||  || — || October 9, 2007 || Socorro || LINEAR || — || align=right | 2.3 km || 
|-id=059 bgcolor=#d6d6d6
| 294059 ||  || — || October 9, 2007 || Socorro || LINEAR || — || align=right | 4.1 km || 
|-id=060 bgcolor=#E9E9E9
| 294060 ||  || — || October 9, 2007 || Socorro || LINEAR || — || align=right | 2.0 km || 
|-id=061 bgcolor=#E9E9E9
| 294061 ||  || — || October 11, 2007 || Socorro || LINEAR || AER || align=right | 1.5 km || 
|-id=062 bgcolor=#E9E9E9
| 294062 ||  || — || October 11, 2007 || Socorro || LINEAR || INO || align=right | 1.6 km || 
|-id=063 bgcolor=#fefefe
| 294063 ||  || — || October 12, 2007 || Socorro || LINEAR || — || align=right | 1.4 km || 
|-id=064 bgcolor=#E9E9E9
| 294064 ||  || — || October 12, 2007 || Socorro || LINEAR || WIT || align=right | 1.4 km || 
|-id=065 bgcolor=#E9E9E9
| 294065 ||  || — || October 12, 2007 || Socorro || LINEAR || — || align=right | 2.5 km || 
|-id=066 bgcolor=#E9E9E9
| 294066 ||  || — || October 12, 2007 || Socorro || LINEAR || — || align=right | 3.2 km || 
|-id=067 bgcolor=#d6d6d6
| 294067 ||  || — || October 12, 2007 || Socorro || LINEAR || — || align=right | 4.6 km || 
|-id=068 bgcolor=#E9E9E9
| 294068 ||  || — || October 4, 2007 || Kitt Peak || Spacewatch || — || align=right | 1.8 km || 
|-id=069 bgcolor=#d6d6d6
| 294069 ||  || — || October 5, 2007 || Kitt Peak || Spacewatch || — || align=right | 3.5 km || 
|-id=070 bgcolor=#d6d6d6
| 294070 ||  || — || October 6, 2007 || Kitt Peak || Spacewatch || — || align=right | 2.6 km || 
|-id=071 bgcolor=#d6d6d6
| 294071 ||  || — || October 6, 2007 || Kitt Peak || Spacewatch || — || align=right | 3.2 km || 
|-id=072 bgcolor=#E9E9E9
| 294072 ||  || — || October 6, 2007 || Kitt Peak || Spacewatch || — || align=right | 2.1 km || 
|-id=073 bgcolor=#d6d6d6
| 294073 ||  || — || October 7, 2007 || Mount Lemmon || Mount Lemmon Survey || — || align=right | 3.7 km || 
|-id=074 bgcolor=#fefefe
| 294074 ||  || — || October 7, 2007 || Kitt Peak || Spacewatch || V || align=right data-sort-value="0.91" | 910 m || 
|-id=075 bgcolor=#fefefe
| 294075 ||  || — || October 8, 2007 || Mount Lemmon || Mount Lemmon Survey || — || align=right data-sort-value="0.68" | 680 m || 
|-id=076 bgcolor=#E9E9E9
| 294076 ||  || — || October 8, 2007 || Anderson Mesa || LONEOS || — || align=right | 1.1 km || 
|-id=077 bgcolor=#E9E9E9
| 294077 ||  || — || October 13, 2007 || Gaisberg || R. Gierlinger || — || align=right data-sort-value="0.85" | 850 m || 
|-id=078 bgcolor=#d6d6d6
| 294078 ||  || — || October 13, 2007 || Socorro || LINEAR || — || align=right | 4.4 km || 
|-id=079 bgcolor=#d6d6d6
| 294079 ||  || — || October 13, 2007 || Socorro || LINEAR || — || align=right | 3.1 km || 
|-id=080 bgcolor=#fefefe
| 294080 ||  || — || October 14, 2007 || Socorro || LINEAR || H || align=right data-sort-value="0.69" | 690 m || 
|-id=081 bgcolor=#fefefe
| 294081 ||  || — || October 4, 2007 || Mount Lemmon || Mount Lemmon Survey || — || align=right data-sort-value="0.75" | 750 m || 
|-id=082 bgcolor=#E9E9E9
| 294082 ||  || — || June 7, 2002 || Palomar || NEAT || EUN || align=right | 1.5 km || 
|-id=083 bgcolor=#d6d6d6
| 294083 ||  || — || October 6, 2007 || Kitt Peak || Spacewatch || KOR || align=right | 1.6 km || 
|-id=084 bgcolor=#E9E9E9
| 294084 ||  || — || October 7, 2007 || Mount Lemmon || Mount Lemmon Survey || — || align=right | 2.1 km || 
|-id=085 bgcolor=#d6d6d6
| 294085 ||  || — || October 8, 2007 || Kitt Peak || Spacewatch || — || align=right | 3.1 km || 
|-id=086 bgcolor=#E9E9E9
| 294086 ||  || — || October 8, 2007 || Kitt Peak || Spacewatch || — || align=right | 2.1 km || 
|-id=087 bgcolor=#d6d6d6
| 294087 ||  || — || October 8, 2007 || Mount Lemmon || Mount Lemmon Survey || — || align=right | 5.7 km || 
|-id=088 bgcolor=#E9E9E9
| 294088 ||  || — || October 9, 2007 || Mount Lemmon || Mount Lemmon Survey || — || align=right | 1.9 km || 
|-id=089 bgcolor=#E9E9E9
| 294089 ||  || — || October 7, 2007 || Kitt Peak || Spacewatch || — || align=right | 1.9 km || 
|-id=090 bgcolor=#E9E9E9
| 294090 ||  || — || October 7, 2007 || Kitt Peak || Spacewatch || — || align=right | 3.5 km || 
|-id=091 bgcolor=#d6d6d6
| 294091 ||  || — || October 7, 2007 || Kitt Peak || Spacewatch || — || align=right | 3.6 km || 
|-id=092 bgcolor=#d6d6d6
| 294092 ||  || — || October 7, 2007 || Kitt Peak || Spacewatch || EOS || align=right | 2.8 km || 
|-id=093 bgcolor=#E9E9E9
| 294093 ||  || — || October 7, 2007 || Kitt Peak || Spacewatch || GEF || align=right | 1.4 km || 
|-id=094 bgcolor=#d6d6d6
| 294094 ||  || — || October 7, 2007 || Kitt Peak || Spacewatch || — || align=right | 3.2 km || 
|-id=095 bgcolor=#d6d6d6
| 294095 ||  || — || October 7, 2007 || Kitt Peak || Spacewatch || — || align=right | 3.3 km || 
|-id=096 bgcolor=#d6d6d6
| 294096 ||  || — || October 7, 2007 || Kitt Peak || Spacewatch || — || align=right | 3.8 km || 
|-id=097 bgcolor=#d6d6d6
| 294097 ||  || — || October 7, 2007 || Kitt Peak || Spacewatch || EOS || align=right | 2.7 km || 
|-id=098 bgcolor=#d6d6d6
| 294098 ||  || — || October 11, 2007 || Mount Lemmon || Mount Lemmon Survey || — || align=right | 4.6 km || 
|-id=099 bgcolor=#fefefe
| 294099 ||  || — || October 8, 2007 || Kitt Peak || Spacewatch || MAS || align=right data-sort-value="0.71" | 710 m || 
|-id=100 bgcolor=#E9E9E9
| 294100 ||  || — || October 8, 2007 || Kitt Peak || Spacewatch || — || align=right | 1.2 km || 
|}

294101–294200 

|-bgcolor=#fefefe
| 294101 ||  || — || October 8, 2007 || Kitt Peak || Spacewatch || — || align=right data-sort-value="0.78" | 780 m || 
|-id=102 bgcolor=#E9E9E9
| 294102 ||  || — || October 8, 2007 || Kitt Peak || Spacewatch || — || align=right data-sort-value="0.95" | 950 m || 
|-id=103 bgcolor=#d6d6d6
| 294103 ||  || — || October 8, 2007 || Mount Lemmon || Mount Lemmon Survey || KOR || align=right | 1.4 km || 
|-id=104 bgcolor=#E9E9E9
| 294104 ||  || — || October 8, 2007 || Kitt Peak || Spacewatch || — || align=right | 2.4 km || 
|-id=105 bgcolor=#E9E9E9
| 294105 ||  || — || October 8, 2007 || Kitt Peak || Spacewatch || — || align=right | 1.2 km || 
|-id=106 bgcolor=#fefefe
| 294106 ||  || — || October 8, 2007 || Kitt Peak || Spacewatch || MAS || align=right data-sort-value="0.94" | 940 m || 
|-id=107 bgcolor=#fefefe
| 294107 ||  || — || October 8, 2007 || Kitt Peak || Spacewatch || V || align=right data-sort-value="0.68" | 680 m || 
|-id=108 bgcolor=#d6d6d6
| 294108 ||  || — || October 8, 2007 || Kitt Peak || Spacewatch || KOR || align=right | 1.5 km || 
|-id=109 bgcolor=#d6d6d6
| 294109 ||  || — || October 8, 2007 || Kitt Peak || Spacewatch || — || align=right | 3.7 km || 
|-id=110 bgcolor=#d6d6d6
| 294110 ||  || — || October 8, 2007 || Kitt Peak || Spacewatch || KOR || align=right | 1.8 km || 
|-id=111 bgcolor=#E9E9E9
| 294111 ||  || — || October 8, 2007 || Kitt Peak || Spacewatch || — || align=right | 1.6 km || 
|-id=112 bgcolor=#E9E9E9
| 294112 ||  || — || October 9, 2007 || Kitt Peak || Spacewatch || — || align=right | 1.9 km || 
|-id=113 bgcolor=#E9E9E9
| 294113 ||  || — || October 9, 2007 || Mount Lemmon || Mount Lemmon Survey || — || align=right | 1.7 km || 
|-id=114 bgcolor=#fefefe
| 294114 ||  || — || October 9, 2007 || Mount Lemmon || Mount Lemmon Survey || V || align=right data-sort-value="0.86" | 860 m || 
|-id=115 bgcolor=#E9E9E9
| 294115 ||  || — || October 7, 2007 || Mount Lemmon || Mount Lemmon Survey || PAD || align=right | 1.8 km || 
|-id=116 bgcolor=#fefefe
| 294116 ||  || — || October 8, 2007 || Catalina || CSS || — || align=right | 1.1 km || 
|-id=117 bgcolor=#E9E9E9
| 294117 ||  || — || October 9, 2007 || Catalina || CSS || EUN || align=right | 2.0 km || 
|-id=118 bgcolor=#E9E9E9
| 294118 ||  || — || October 9, 2007 || Catalina || CSS || — || align=right | 2.7 km || 
|-id=119 bgcolor=#d6d6d6
| 294119 ||  || — || October 11, 2007 || Mount Lemmon || Mount Lemmon Survey || — || align=right | 3.9 km || 
|-id=120 bgcolor=#E9E9E9
| 294120 ||  || — || October 8, 2007 || Mount Lemmon || Mount Lemmon Survey || — || align=right | 1.7 km || 
|-id=121 bgcolor=#fefefe
| 294121 ||  || — || October 10, 2007 || Mount Lemmon || Mount Lemmon Survey || NYS || align=right data-sort-value="0.58" | 580 m || 
|-id=122 bgcolor=#E9E9E9
| 294122 ||  || — || October 10, 2007 || Kitt Peak || Spacewatch || — || align=right | 2.2 km || 
|-id=123 bgcolor=#E9E9E9
| 294123 ||  || — || October 11, 2007 || Kitt Peak || Spacewatch || WIT || align=right | 1.1 km || 
|-id=124 bgcolor=#d6d6d6
| 294124 ||  || — || October 9, 2007 || Kitt Peak || Spacewatch || — || align=right | 4.2 km || 
|-id=125 bgcolor=#E9E9E9
| 294125 ||  || — || October 9, 2007 || Kitt Peak || Spacewatch || — || align=right | 3.8 km || 
|-id=126 bgcolor=#E9E9E9
| 294126 ||  || — || October 9, 2007 || Kitt Peak || Spacewatch || — || align=right | 1.2 km || 
|-id=127 bgcolor=#E9E9E9
| 294127 ||  || — || October 9, 2007 || Kitt Peak || Spacewatch || HOF || align=right | 3.1 km || 
|-id=128 bgcolor=#fefefe
| 294128 ||  || — || October 9, 2007 || Kitt Peak || Spacewatch || — || align=right | 1.2 km || 
|-id=129 bgcolor=#E9E9E9
| 294129 ||  || — || October 9, 2007 || Kitt Peak || Spacewatch || — || align=right | 1.1 km || 
|-id=130 bgcolor=#fefefe
| 294130 ||  || — || October 9, 2007 || Kitt Peak || Spacewatch || V || align=right | 1.0 km || 
|-id=131 bgcolor=#fefefe
| 294131 ||  || — || October 11, 2007 || Kitt Peak || Spacewatch || NYS || align=right data-sort-value="0.85" | 850 m || 
|-id=132 bgcolor=#C2FFFF
| 294132 ||  || — || October 11, 2007 || Kitt Peak || Spacewatch || L4 || align=right | 13 km || 
|-id=133 bgcolor=#E9E9E9
| 294133 ||  || — || October 11, 2007 || Mount Lemmon || Mount Lemmon Survey || — || align=right | 1.4 km || 
|-id=134 bgcolor=#fefefe
| 294134 ||  || — || October 8, 2007 || Mount Lemmon || Mount Lemmon Survey || — || align=right | 1.1 km || 
|-id=135 bgcolor=#fefefe
| 294135 ||  || — || October 12, 2007 || Mount Lemmon || Mount Lemmon Survey || V || align=right data-sort-value="0.85" | 850 m || 
|-id=136 bgcolor=#fefefe
| 294136 ||  || — || October 12, 2007 || Catalina || CSS || NYS || align=right data-sort-value="0.77" | 770 m || 
|-id=137 bgcolor=#d6d6d6
| 294137 ||  || — || October 13, 2007 || Mount Lemmon || Mount Lemmon Survey || — || align=right | 5.0 km || 
|-id=138 bgcolor=#fefefe
| 294138 ||  || — || October 9, 2007 || Mount Lemmon || Mount Lemmon Survey || FLO || align=right data-sort-value="0.74" | 740 m || 
|-id=139 bgcolor=#fefefe
| 294139 ||  || — || October 12, 2007 || Kitt Peak || Spacewatch || — || align=right data-sort-value="0.76" | 760 m || 
|-id=140 bgcolor=#E9E9E9
| 294140 ||  || — || October 12, 2007 || Kitt Peak || Spacewatch || — || align=right | 2.1 km || 
|-id=141 bgcolor=#fefefe
| 294141 ||  || — || October 12, 2007 || Kitt Peak || Spacewatch || NYS || align=right data-sort-value="0.75" | 750 m || 
|-id=142 bgcolor=#d6d6d6
| 294142 ||  || — || October 12, 2007 || Anderson Mesa || LONEOS || — || align=right | 3.5 km || 
|-id=143 bgcolor=#d6d6d6
| 294143 ||  || — || October 11, 2007 || Kitt Peak || Spacewatch || — || align=right | 3.2 km || 
|-id=144 bgcolor=#d6d6d6
| 294144 ||  || — || October 11, 2007 || Mount Lemmon || Mount Lemmon Survey || — || align=right | 2.3 km || 
|-id=145 bgcolor=#fefefe
| 294145 ||  || — || October 12, 2007 || Kitt Peak || Spacewatch || — || align=right data-sort-value="0.68" | 680 m || 
|-id=146 bgcolor=#fefefe
| 294146 ||  || — || October 12, 2007 || Kitt Peak || Spacewatch || — || align=right data-sort-value="0.74" | 740 m || 
|-id=147 bgcolor=#fefefe
| 294147 ||  || — || October 12, 2007 || Kitt Peak || Spacewatch || — || align=right data-sort-value="0.98" | 980 m || 
|-id=148 bgcolor=#d6d6d6
| 294148 ||  || — || October 12, 2007 || Kitt Peak || Spacewatch || — || align=right | 5.2 km || 
|-id=149 bgcolor=#E9E9E9
| 294149 ||  || — || October 14, 2007 || Mount Lemmon || Mount Lemmon Survey || — || align=right | 1.4 km || 
|-id=150 bgcolor=#d6d6d6
| 294150 ||  || — || October 11, 2007 || Kitt Peak || Spacewatch || CHA || align=right | 3.0 km || 
|-id=151 bgcolor=#E9E9E9
| 294151 ||  || — || October 11, 2007 || Kitt Peak || Spacewatch || — || align=right | 2.4 km || 
|-id=152 bgcolor=#E9E9E9
| 294152 ||  || — || October 11, 2007 || Kitt Peak || Spacewatch || — || align=right | 2.2 km || 
|-id=153 bgcolor=#E9E9E9
| 294153 ||  || — || October 11, 2007 || Kitt Peak || Spacewatch || AGN || align=right | 1.2 km || 
|-id=154 bgcolor=#E9E9E9
| 294154 ||  || — || October 11, 2007 || Kitt Peak || Spacewatch || — || align=right | 3.1 km || 
|-id=155 bgcolor=#E9E9E9
| 294155 ||  || — || October 12, 2007 || Kitt Peak || Spacewatch || HNA || align=right | 3.0 km || 
|-id=156 bgcolor=#fefefe
| 294156 ||  || — || October 13, 2007 || Catalina || CSS || — || align=right | 1.1 km || 
|-id=157 bgcolor=#E9E9E9
| 294157 ||  || — || October 8, 2007 || Mount Lemmon || Mount Lemmon Survey || — || align=right data-sort-value="0.86" | 860 m || 
|-id=158 bgcolor=#fefefe
| 294158 ||  || — || October 14, 2007 || Mount Lemmon || Mount Lemmon Survey || NYS || align=right data-sort-value="0.76" | 760 m || 
|-id=159 bgcolor=#C2FFFF
| 294159 ||  || — || October 14, 2007 || Mount Lemmon || Mount Lemmon Survey || L4 || align=right | 14 km || 
|-id=160 bgcolor=#E9E9E9
| 294160 ||  || — || October 13, 2007 || Kitt Peak || Spacewatch || NEM || align=right | 2.8 km || 
|-id=161 bgcolor=#E9E9E9
| 294161 ||  || — || October 13, 2007 || Kitt Peak || Spacewatch || — || align=right | 2.2 km || 
|-id=162 bgcolor=#d6d6d6
| 294162 ||  || — || October 14, 2007 || Mount Lemmon || Mount Lemmon Survey || KOR || align=right | 1.5 km || 
|-id=163 bgcolor=#d6d6d6
| 294163 ||  || — || October 14, 2007 || Mount Lemmon || Mount Lemmon Survey || ALA || align=right | 6.7 km || 
|-id=164 bgcolor=#fefefe
| 294164 ||  || — || October 9, 2007 || Mount Lemmon || Mount Lemmon Survey || NYS || align=right data-sort-value="0.76" | 760 m || 
|-id=165 bgcolor=#E9E9E9
| 294165 ||  || — || October 11, 2007 || Kitt Peak || Spacewatch || MRX || align=right | 1.3 km || 
|-id=166 bgcolor=#d6d6d6
| 294166 ||  || — || October 11, 2007 || Mount Lemmon || Mount Lemmon Survey || KOR || align=right | 1.5 km || 
|-id=167 bgcolor=#E9E9E9
| 294167 ||  || — || October 12, 2007 || Catalina || CSS || — || align=right | 1.0 km || 
|-id=168 bgcolor=#E9E9E9
| 294168 ||  || — || October 12, 2007 || Goodricke-Pigott || R. A. Tucker || ADE || align=right | 3.7 km || 
|-id=169 bgcolor=#FA8072
| 294169 ||  || — || October 14, 2007 || Mount Lemmon || Mount Lemmon Survey || PHO || align=right | 1.7 km || 
|-id=170 bgcolor=#E9E9E9
| 294170 ||  || — || October 11, 2007 || Catalina || CSS || — || align=right | 1.2 km || 
|-id=171 bgcolor=#E9E9E9
| 294171 ||  || — || October 14, 2007 || Kitt Peak || Spacewatch || EUN || align=right | 1.3 km || 
|-id=172 bgcolor=#E9E9E9
| 294172 ||  || — || October 12, 2007 || Kitt Peak || Spacewatch || — || align=right | 2.2 km || 
|-id=173 bgcolor=#d6d6d6
| 294173 ||  || — || October 13, 2007 || Kitt Peak || Spacewatch || KAR || align=right | 1.2 km || 
|-id=174 bgcolor=#E9E9E9
| 294174 ||  || — || October 13, 2007 || Mount Lemmon || Mount Lemmon Survey || — || align=right | 1.7 km || 
|-id=175 bgcolor=#d6d6d6
| 294175 ||  || — || October 13, 2007 || Catalina || CSS || — || align=right | 4.6 km || 
|-id=176 bgcolor=#E9E9E9
| 294176 ||  || — || October 13, 2007 || Kitt Peak || Spacewatch || HNS || align=right | 1.5 km || 
|-id=177 bgcolor=#fefefe
| 294177 ||  || — || October 14, 2007 || Mount Lemmon || Mount Lemmon Survey || — || align=right data-sort-value="0.96" | 960 m || 
|-id=178 bgcolor=#E9E9E9
| 294178 ||  || — || October 15, 2007 || Kitt Peak || Spacewatch || AGN || align=right | 1.2 km || 
|-id=179 bgcolor=#fefefe
| 294179 ||  || — || October 15, 2007 || Catalina || CSS || NYS || align=right data-sort-value="0.91" | 910 m || 
|-id=180 bgcolor=#d6d6d6
| 294180 ||  || — || October 15, 2007 || Catalina || CSS || SHU3:2 || align=right | 4.8 km || 
|-id=181 bgcolor=#d6d6d6
| 294181 ||  || — || October 15, 2007 || Kitt Peak || Spacewatch || KOR || align=right | 1.6 km || 
|-id=182 bgcolor=#E9E9E9
| 294182 ||  || — || October 15, 2007 || Mount Lemmon || Mount Lemmon Survey || — || align=right | 1.3 km || 
|-id=183 bgcolor=#E9E9E9
| 294183 ||  || — || October 15, 2007 || Kitt Peak || Spacewatch || WIT || align=right | 1.7 km || 
|-id=184 bgcolor=#d6d6d6
| 294184 ||  || — || October 15, 2007 || Kitt Peak || Spacewatch || LIX || align=right | 4.6 km || 
|-id=185 bgcolor=#E9E9E9
| 294185 ||  || — || October 14, 2007 || Mount Lemmon || Mount Lemmon Survey || — || align=right | 1.8 km || 
|-id=186 bgcolor=#fefefe
| 294186 ||  || — || October 14, 2007 || Mount Lemmon || Mount Lemmon Survey || — || align=right data-sort-value="0.89" | 890 m || 
|-id=187 bgcolor=#E9E9E9
| 294187 ||  || — || October 15, 2007 || Kitt Peak || Spacewatch || — || align=right | 2.6 km || 
|-id=188 bgcolor=#E9E9E9
| 294188 ||  || — || October 15, 2007 || Catalina || CSS || MAR || align=right | 1.8 km || 
|-id=189 bgcolor=#d6d6d6
| 294189 ||  || — || October 14, 2007 || Catalina || CSS || — || align=right | 5.3 km || 
|-id=190 bgcolor=#E9E9E9
| 294190 ||  || — || October 14, 2007 || Catalina || CSS || — || align=right | 3.5 km || 
|-id=191 bgcolor=#fefefe
| 294191 ||  || — || October 14, 2007 || Catalina || CSS || — || align=right data-sort-value="0.97" | 970 m || 
|-id=192 bgcolor=#d6d6d6
| 294192 ||  || — || October 15, 2007 || Anderson Mesa || LONEOS || — || align=right | 3.2 km || 
|-id=193 bgcolor=#E9E9E9
| 294193 ||  || — || October 15, 2007 || Catalina || CSS || — || align=right | 2.6 km || 
|-id=194 bgcolor=#E9E9E9
| 294194 ||  || — || October 7, 2007 || Kitt Peak || Spacewatch || — || align=right | 1.6 km || 
|-id=195 bgcolor=#d6d6d6
| 294195 ||  || — || October 8, 2007 || Mount Lemmon || Mount Lemmon Survey || — || align=right | 2.7 km || 
|-id=196 bgcolor=#d6d6d6
| 294196 ||  || — || October 12, 2007 || Mount Lemmon || Mount Lemmon Survey || EOS || align=right | 1.9 km || 
|-id=197 bgcolor=#E9E9E9
| 294197 ||  || — || October 12, 2007 || Catalina || CSS || — || align=right | 2.9 km || 
|-id=198 bgcolor=#E9E9E9
| 294198 ||  || — || October 12, 2007 || Catalina || CSS || MAR || align=right | 1.3 km || 
|-id=199 bgcolor=#E9E9E9
| 294199 ||  || — || October 15, 2007 || Catalina || CSS || — || align=right | 2.9 km || 
|-id=200 bgcolor=#fefefe
| 294200 ||  || — || October 9, 2007 || Kitt Peak || Spacewatch || — || align=right | 1.2 km || 
|}

294201–294300 

|-bgcolor=#d6d6d6
| 294201 ||  || — || October 12, 2007 || Kitt Peak || Spacewatch || — || align=right | 3.5 km || 
|-id=202 bgcolor=#fefefe
| 294202 ||  || — || October 11, 2007 || Kitt Peak || Spacewatch || V || align=right data-sort-value="0.71" | 710 m || 
|-id=203 bgcolor=#d6d6d6
| 294203 ||  || — || October 13, 2007 || Kitt Peak || Spacewatch || — || align=right | 3.1 km || 
|-id=204 bgcolor=#fefefe
| 294204 ||  || — || October 14, 2007 || Mount Lemmon || Mount Lemmon Survey || — || align=right data-sort-value="0.92" | 920 m || 
|-id=205 bgcolor=#E9E9E9
| 294205 ||  || — || October 14, 2007 || Mount Lemmon || Mount Lemmon Survey || — || align=right | 1.2 km || 
|-id=206 bgcolor=#E9E9E9
| 294206 ||  || — || October 4, 2007 || Mount Lemmon || Mount Lemmon Survey || — || align=right data-sort-value="0.95" | 950 m || 
|-id=207 bgcolor=#d6d6d6
| 294207 ||  || — || October 12, 2007 || Mount Lemmon || Mount Lemmon Survey || — || align=right | 3.2 km || 
|-id=208 bgcolor=#d6d6d6
| 294208 ||  || — || October 15, 2007 || Mount Lemmon || Mount Lemmon Survey || — || align=right | 3.2 km || 
|-id=209 bgcolor=#E9E9E9
| 294209 ||  || — || October 8, 2007 || Catalina || CSS || — || align=right | 2.7 km || 
|-id=210 bgcolor=#E9E9E9
| 294210 || 2007 UA || — || October 16, 2007 || Mayhill || A. Lowe || — || align=right | 2.6 km || 
|-id=211 bgcolor=#E9E9E9
| 294211 || 2007 UY || — || October 16, 2007 || 7300 Observatory || W. K. Y. Yeung || — || align=right | 1.6 km || 
|-id=212 bgcolor=#E9E9E9
| 294212 ||  || — || October 18, 2007 || Mayhill || A. Lowe || — || align=right | 1.7 km || 
|-id=213 bgcolor=#d6d6d6
| 294213 ||  || — || October 18, 2007 || 7300 || W. K. Y. Yeung || — || align=right | 2.7 km || 
|-id=214 bgcolor=#E9E9E9
| 294214 ||  || — || October 16, 2007 || 7300 || W. K. Y. Yeung || — || align=right | 2.8 km || 
|-id=215 bgcolor=#d6d6d6
| 294215 ||  || — || October 18, 2007 || Junk Bond || D. Healy || — || align=right | 5.0 km || 
|-id=216 bgcolor=#E9E9E9
| 294216 ||  || — || October 16, 2007 || Bisei SG Center || BATTeRS || — || align=right | 2.9 km || 
|-id=217 bgcolor=#E9E9E9
| 294217 ||  || — || October 20, 2007 || Tiki || N. Teamo || — || align=right | 1.9 km || 
|-id=218 bgcolor=#E9E9E9
| 294218 ||  || — || October 19, 2007 || Socorro || LINEAR || — || align=right | 3.4 km || 
|-id=219 bgcolor=#E9E9E9
| 294219 ||  || — || October 17, 2007 || Anderson Mesa || LONEOS || EUN || align=right | 1.6 km || 
|-id=220 bgcolor=#fefefe
| 294220 ||  || — || October 18, 2007 || Anderson Mesa || LONEOS || V || align=right data-sort-value="0.91" | 910 m || 
|-id=221 bgcolor=#d6d6d6
| 294221 ||  || — || October 18, 2007 || Anderson Mesa || LONEOS || — || align=right | 3.9 km || 
|-id=222 bgcolor=#E9E9E9
| 294222 ||  || — || October 16, 2007 || Catalina || CSS || — || align=right | 2.5 km || 
|-id=223 bgcolor=#E9E9E9
| 294223 ||  || — || October 17, 2007 || Anderson Mesa || LONEOS || — || align=right | 3.4 km || 
|-id=224 bgcolor=#fefefe
| 294224 ||  || — || October 17, 2007 || Anderson Mesa || LONEOS || V || align=right data-sort-value="0.98" | 980 m || 
|-id=225 bgcolor=#d6d6d6
| 294225 ||  || — || October 16, 2007 || Kitt Peak || Spacewatch || — || align=right | 3.0 km || 
|-id=226 bgcolor=#d6d6d6
| 294226 ||  || — || October 16, 2007 || Kitt Peak || Spacewatch || BRA || align=right | 2.8 km || 
|-id=227 bgcolor=#d6d6d6
| 294227 ||  || — || October 16, 2007 || Kitt Peak || Spacewatch || — || align=right | 2.8 km || 
|-id=228 bgcolor=#d6d6d6
| 294228 ||  || — || October 16, 2007 || Kitt Peak || Spacewatch || — || align=right | 3.4 km || 
|-id=229 bgcolor=#fefefe
| 294229 ||  || — || October 16, 2007 || Kitt Peak || Spacewatch || — || align=right | 1.0 km || 
|-id=230 bgcolor=#E9E9E9
| 294230 ||  || — || October 16, 2007 || Mount Lemmon || Mount Lemmon Survey || — || align=right | 2.2 km || 
|-id=231 bgcolor=#d6d6d6
| 294231 ||  || — || October 17, 2007 || Anderson Mesa || LONEOS || URS || align=right | 5.1 km || 
|-id=232 bgcolor=#fefefe
| 294232 ||  || — || October 18, 2007 || Kitt Peak || Spacewatch || — || align=right | 1.4 km || 
|-id=233 bgcolor=#fefefe
| 294233 ||  || — || October 18, 2007 || Kitt Peak || Spacewatch || — || align=right data-sort-value="0.99" | 990 m || 
|-id=234 bgcolor=#E9E9E9
| 294234 ||  || — || October 17, 2007 || Anderson Mesa || LONEOS || GER || align=right | 1.6 km || 
|-id=235 bgcolor=#E9E9E9
| 294235 ||  || — || October 19, 2007 || Kitt Peak || Spacewatch || — || align=right | 1.1 km || 
|-id=236 bgcolor=#E9E9E9
| 294236 ||  || — || October 19, 2007 || Catalina || CSS || — || align=right | 2.9 km || 
|-id=237 bgcolor=#d6d6d6
| 294237 ||  || — || October 19, 2007 || Kitt Peak || Spacewatch || — || align=right | 4.0 km || 
|-id=238 bgcolor=#E9E9E9
| 294238 ||  || — || October 19, 2007 || Kitt Peak || Spacewatch || — || align=right | 1.7 km || 
|-id=239 bgcolor=#E9E9E9
| 294239 ||  || — || October 20, 2007 || Catalina || CSS || — || align=right | 1.6 km || 
|-id=240 bgcolor=#d6d6d6
| 294240 ||  || — || October 16, 2007 || Kitt Peak || Spacewatch || — || align=right | 2.7 km || 
|-id=241 bgcolor=#d6d6d6
| 294241 ||  || — || October 16, 2007 || Kitt Peak || Spacewatch || EOS || align=right | 2.5 km || 
|-id=242 bgcolor=#E9E9E9
| 294242 ||  || — || October 16, 2007 || Mount Lemmon || Mount Lemmon Survey || — || align=right | 1.9 km || 
|-id=243 bgcolor=#E9E9E9
| 294243 ||  || — || October 20, 2007 || Catalina || CSS || — || align=right | 1.5 km || 
|-id=244 bgcolor=#fefefe
| 294244 ||  || — || October 20, 2007 || Mount Lemmon || Mount Lemmon Survey || V || align=right data-sort-value="0.65" | 650 m || 
|-id=245 bgcolor=#fefefe
| 294245 ||  || — || October 24, 2007 || Mount Lemmon || Mount Lemmon Survey || — || align=right | 1.1 km || 
|-id=246 bgcolor=#d6d6d6
| 294246 ||  || — || October 24, 2007 || Mount Lemmon || Mount Lemmon Survey || — || align=right | 3.6 km || 
|-id=247 bgcolor=#fefefe
| 294247 ||  || — || October 30, 2007 || Mount Lemmon || Mount Lemmon Survey || V || align=right data-sort-value="0.71" | 710 m || 
|-id=248 bgcolor=#E9E9E9
| 294248 ||  || — || October 30, 2007 || Mount Lemmon || Mount Lemmon Survey || PAD || align=right | 3.0 km || 
|-id=249 bgcolor=#fefefe
| 294249 ||  || — || October 30, 2007 || Mount Lemmon || Mount Lemmon Survey || — || align=right | 1.1 km || 
|-id=250 bgcolor=#fefefe
| 294250 ||  || — || October 31, 2007 || Mount Lemmon || Mount Lemmon Survey || NYS || align=right data-sort-value="0.72" | 720 m || 
|-id=251 bgcolor=#E9E9E9
| 294251 ||  || — || October 31, 2007 || Kitt Peak || Spacewatch || — || align=right | 2.2 km || 
|-id=252 bgcolor=#fefefe
| 294252 ||  || — || October 30, 2007 || Catalina || CSS || — || align=right data-sort-value="0.96" | 960 m || 
|-id=253 bgcolor=#d6d6d6
| 294253 ||  || — || October 30, 2007 || Mount Lemmon || Mount Lemmon Survey || — || align=right | 2.3 km || 
|-id=254 bgcolor=#fefefe
| 294254 ||  || — || October 30, 2007 || Catalina || CSS || FLO || align=right data-sort-value="0.85" | 850 m || 
|-id=255 bgcolor=#fefefe
| 294255 ||  || — || October 30, 2007 || Mount Lemmon || Mount Lemmon Survey || — || align=right data-sort-value="0.72" | 720 m || 
|-id=256 bgcolor=#E9E9E9
| 294256 ||  || — || October 31, 2007 || Mount Lemmon || Mount Lemmon Survey || — || align=right | 2.7 km || 
|-id=257 bgcolor=#d6d6d6
| 294257 ||  || — || October 31, 2007 || Mount Lemmon || Mount Lemmon Survey || KOR || align=right | 1.8 km || 
|-id=258 bgcolor=#E9E9E9
| 294258 ||  || — || October 31, 2007 || Mount Lemmon || Mount Lemmon Survey || MRX || align=right | 1.5 km || 
|-id=259 bgcolor=#E9E9E9
| 294259 ||  || — || October 30, 2007 || Kitt Peak || Spacewatch || — || align=right | 2.4 km || 
|-id=260 bgcolor=#E9E9E9
| 294260 ||  || — || October 30, 2007 || Kitt Peak || Spacewatch || — || align=right | 1.3 km || 
|-id=261 bgcolor=#d6d6d6
| 294261 ||  || — || October 30, 2007 || Kitt Peak || Spacewatch || — || align=right | 2.3 km || 
|-id=262 bgcolor=#E9E9E9
| 294262 ||  || — || October 30, 2007 || Kitt Peak || Spacewatch || HEN || align=right | 1.3 km || 
|-id=263 bgcolor=#d6d6d6
| 294263 ||  || — || October 30, 2007 || Kitt Peak || Spacewatch || — || align=right | 4.1 km || 
|-id=264 bgcolor=#d6d6d6
| 294264 ||  || — || October 30, 2007 || Kitt Peak || Spacewatch || KOR || align=right | 1.5 km || 
|-id=265 bgcolor=#fefefe
| 294265 ||  || — || October 31, 2007 || Mount Lemmon || Mount Lemmon Survey || FLO || align=right data-sort-value="0.97" | 970 m || 
|-id=266 bgcolor=#E9E9E9
| 294266 ||  || — || October 31, 2007 || Mount Lemmon || Mount Lemmon Survey || AGN || align=right | 1.5 km || 
|-id=267 bgcolor=#fefefe
| 294267 ||  || — || October 30, 2007 || Mount Lemmon || Mount Lemmon Survey || — || align=right data-sort-value="0.94" | 940 m || 
|-id=268 bgcolor=#d6d6d6
| 294268 ||  || — || October 30, 2007 || Mount Lemmon || Mount Lemmon Survey || — || align=right | 2.8 km || 
|-id=269 bgcolor=#fefefe
| 294269 ||  || — || October 30, 2007 || Kitt Peak || Spacewatch || FLO || align=right data-sort-value="0.80" | 800 m || 
|-id=270 bgcolor=#E9E9E9
| 294270 ||  || — || October 30, 2007 || Kitt Peak || Spacewatch || — || align=right | 1.8 km || 
|-id=271 bgcolor=#fefefe
| 294271 ||  || — || October 30, 2007 || Kitt Peak || Spacewatch || — || align=right data-sort-value="0.67" | 670 m || 
|-id=272 bgcolor=#fefefe
| 294272 ||  || — || October 30, 2007 || Kitt Peak || Spacewatch || — || align=right data-sort-value="0.92" | 920 m || 
|-id=273 bgcolor=#d6d6d6
| 294273 ||  || — || October 30, 2007 || Kitt Peak || Spacewatch || — || align=right | 3.8 km || 
|-id=274 bgcolor=#d6d6d6
| 294274 ||  || — || October 30, 2007 || Mount Lemmon || Mount Lemmon Survey || — || align=right | 3.6 km || 
|-id=275 bgcolor=#d6d6d6
| 294275 ||  || — || October 30, 2007 || Mount Lemmon || Mount Lemmon Survey || — || align=right | 2.9 km || 
|-id=276 bgcolor=#fefefe
| 294276 ||  || — || October 30, 2007 || Kitt Peak || Spacewatch || NYS || align=right data-sort-value="0.71" | 710 m || 
|-id=277 bgcolor=#E9E9E9
| 294277 ||  || — || October 30, 2007 || Kitt Peak || Spacewatch || — || align=right | 2.7 km || 
|-id=278 bgcolor=#E9E9E9
| 294278 ||  || — || October 30, 2007 || Kitt Peak || Spacewatch || RAF || align=right | 1.5 km || 
|-id=279 bgcolor=#d6d6d6
| 294279 ||  || — || October 31, 2007 || Mount Lemmon || Mount Lemmon Survey || — || align=right | 3.2 km || 
|-id=280 bgcolor=#E9E9E9
| 294280 ||  || — || October 31, 2007 || Mount Lemmon || Mount Lemmon Survey || — || align=right data-sort-value="0.95" | 950 m || 
|-id=281 bgcolor=#E9E9E9
| 294281 ||  || — || October 30, 2007 || Kitt Peak || Spacewatch || — || align=right | 2.0 km || 
|-id=282 bgcolor=#fefefe
| 294282 ||  || — || October 30, 2007 || Kitt Peak || Spacewatch || — || align=right data-sort-value="0.89" | 890 m || 
|-id=283 bgcolor=#fefefe
| 294283 ||  || — || October 30, 2007 || Mount Lemmon || Mount Lemmon Survey || — || align=right data-sort-value="0.93" | 930 m || 
|-id=284 bgcolor=#E9E9E9
| 294284 ||  || — || October 30, 2007 || Mount Lemmon || Mount Lemmon Survey || — || align=right | 2.1 km || 
|-id=285 bgcolor=#fefefe
| 294285 ||  || — || October 31, 2007 || Kitt Peak || Spacewatch || — || align=right data-sort-value="0.94" | 940 m || 
|-id=286 bgcolor=#d6d6d6
| 294286 ||  || — || October 31, 2007 || Kitt Peak || Spacewatch || — || align=right | 3.1 km || 
|-id=287 bgcolor=#E9E9E9
| 294287 ||  || — || October 30, 2007 || Kitt Peak || Spacewatch || — || align=right | 1.7 km || 
|-id=288 bgcolor=#E9E9E9
| 294288 ||  || — || October 30, 2007 || Catalina || CSS || — || align=right | 2.4 km || 
|-id=289 bgcolor=#d6d6d6
| 294289 ||  || — || October 31, 2007 || Mount Lemmon || Mount Lemmon Survey || — || align=right | 2.9 km || 
|-id=290 bgcolor=#E9E9E9
| 294290 ||  || — || October 19, 2007 || Mount Lemmon || Mount Lemmon Survey || — || align=right | 2.0 km || 
|-id=291 bgcolor=#fefefe
| 294291 ||  || — || October 17, 2007 || Mount Lemmon || Mount Lemmon Survey || V || align=right data-sort-value="0.79" | 790 m || 
|-id=292 bgcolor=#d6d6d6
| 294292 ||  || — || October 20, 2007 || Mount Lemmon || Mount Lemmon Survey || TIR || align=right | 3.8 km || 
|-id=293 bgcolor=#E9E9E9
| 294293 ||  || — || October 20, 2007 || Catalina || CSS || JUN || align=right | 2.9 km || 
|-id=294 bgcolor=#E9E9E9
| 294294 ||  || — || November 1, 2007 || 7300 || W. K. Y. Yeung || — || align=right | 2.1 km || 
|-id=295 bgcolor=#E9E9E9
| 294295 Brodardmarc || 2007 VU ||  || November 1, 2007 || Marly || P. Kocher || — || align=right | 1.1 km || 
|-id=296 bgcolor=#fefefe
| 294296 Efeso ||  ||  || November 3, 2007 || Vallemare di Borbona || V. S. Casulli || — || align=right data-sort-value="0.85" | 850 m || 
|-id=297 bgcolor=#E9E9E9
| 294297 ||  || — || November 3, 2007 || Majorca || OAM Obs. || — || align=right | 3.5 km || 
|-id=298 bgcolor=#E9E9E9
| 294298 ||  || — || November 3, 2007 || Kitami || K. Endate || — || align=right | 3.0 km || 
|-id=299 bgcolor=#d6d6d6
| 294299 ||  || — || November 1, 2007 || Kitt Peak || Spacewatch || — || align=right | 2.9 km || 
|-id=300 bgcolor=#E9E9E9
| 294300 ||  || — || November 2, 2007 || Mount Lemmon || Mount Lemmon Survey || — || align=right | 2.9 km || 
|}

294301–294400 

|-bgcolor=#E9E9E9
| 294301 ||  || — || November 5, 2007 || Mount Lemmon || Mount Lemmon Survey || — || align=right | 2.9 km || 
|-id=302 bgcolor=#E9E9E9
| 294302 ||  || — || November 3, 2007 || Needville || Needville Obs. || HOF || align=right | 3.6 km || 
|-id=303 bgcolor=#fefefe
| 294303 ||  || — || November 2, 2007 || Catalina || CSS || V || align=right data-sort-value="0.77" | 770 m || 
|-id=304 bgcolor=#d6d6d6
| 294304 ||  || — || November 1, 2007 || Kitt Peak || Spacewatch || EOS || align=right | 2.9 km || 
|-id=305 bgcolor=#fefefe
| 294305 ||  || — || November 1, 2007 || Kitt Peak || Spacewatch || FLO || align=right data-sort-value="0.64" | 640 m || 
|-id=306 bgcolor=#fefefe
| 294306 ||  || — || November 1, 2007 || Kitt Peak || Spacewatch || V || align=right data-sort-value="0.86" | 860 m || 
|-id=307 bgcolor=#fefefe
| 294307 ||  || — || November 2, 2007 || Mount Lemmon || Mount Lemmon Survey || — || align=right | 1.1 km || 
|-id=308 bgcolor=#E9E9E9
| 294308 ||  || — || November 1, 2007 || Kitt Peak || Spacewatch || — || align=right | 2.6 km || 
|-id=309 bgcolor=#fefefe
| 294309 ||  || — || November 2, 2007 || Kitt Peak || Spacewatch || — || align=right data-sort-value="0.92" | 920 m || 
|-id=310 bgcolor=#fefefe
| 294310 ||  || — || November 2, 2007 || Kitt Peak || Spacewatch || V || align=right data-sort-value="0.87" | 870 m || 
|-id=311 bgcolor=#fefefe
| 294311 ||  || — || November 2, 2007 || Catalina || CSS || — || align=right data-sort-value="0.91" | 910 m || 
|-id=312 bgcolor=#fefefe
| 294312 ||  || — || November 1, 2007 || Kitt Peak || Spacewatch || — || align=right | 1.0 km || 
|-id=313 bgcolor=#E9E9E9
| 294313 ||  || — || November 1, 2007 || Kitt Peak || Spacewatch || — || align=right | 1.7 km || 
|-id=314 bgcolor=#fefefe
| 294314 ||  || — || November 1, 2007 || Kitt Peak || Spacewatch || — || align=right | 1.3 km || 
|-id=315 bgcolor=#fefefe
| 294315 ||  || — || November 1, 2007 || Kitt Peak || Spacewatch || — || align=right data-sort-value="0.76" | 760 m || 
|-id=316 bgcolor=#fefefe
| 294316 ||  || — || November 1, 2007 || Kitt Peak || Spacewatch || FLO || align=right data-sort-value="0.76" | 760 m || 
|-id=317 bgcolor=#E9E9E9
| 294317 ||  || — || November 1, 2007 || Kitt Peak || Spacewatch || — || align=right | 1.8 km || 
|-id=318 bgcolor=#E9E9E9
| 294318 ||  || — || November 1, 2007 || Kitt Peak || Spacewatch || AGN || align=right | 1.6 km || 
|-id=319 bgcolor=#d6d6d6
| 294319 ||  || — || November 1, 2007 || Kitt Peak || Spacewatch || — || align=right | 2.9 km || 
|-id=320 bgcolor=#E9E9E9
| 294320 ||  || — || November 1, 2007 || Kitt Peak || Spacewatch || — || align=right | 2.4 km || 
|-id=321 bgcolor=#E9E9E9
| 294321 ||  || — || November 1, 2007 || Kitt Peak || Spacewatch || — || align=right | 2.5 km || 
|-id=322 bgcolor=#fefefe
| 294322 ||  || — || November 1, 2007 || Kitt Peak || Spacewatch || FLO || align=right data-sort-value="0.67" | 670 m || 
|-id=323 bgcolor=#d6d6d6
| 294323 ||  || — || November 1, 2007 || Kitt Peak || Spacewatch || VER || align=right | 2.7 km || 
|-id=324 bgcolor=#d6d6d6
| 294324 ||  || — || November 1, 2007 || Kitt Peak || Spacewatch || — || align=right | 3.5 km || 
|-id=325 bgcolor=#E9E9E9
| 294325 ||  || — || November 1, 2007 || Kitt Peak || Spacewatch || WIT || align=right | 1.1 km || 
|-id=326 bgcolor=#E9E9E9
| 294326 ||  || — || November 1, 2007 || Kitt Peak || Spacewatch || HOF || align=right | 3.2 km || 
|-id=327 bgcolor=#d6d6d6
| 294327 ||  || — || November 1, 2007 || Kitt Peak || Spacewatch || — || align=right | 3.3 km || 
|-id=328 bgcolor=#d6d6d6
| 294328 ||  || — || November 1, 2007 || Kitt Peak || Spacewatch || — || align=right | 2.5 km || 
|-id=329 bgcolor=#fefefe
| 294329 ||  || — || November 1, 2007 || Kitt Peak || Spacewatch || — || align=right data-sort-value="0.78" | 780 m || 
|-id=330 bgcolor=#E9E9E9
| 294330 ||  || — || November 1, 2007 || Kitt Peak || Spacewatch || — || align=right | 2.4 km || 
|-id=331 bgcolor=#d6d6d6
| 294331 ||  || — || November 2, 2007 || Kitt Peak || Spacewatch || — || align=right | 3.3 km || 
|-id=332 bgcolor=#E9E9E9
| 294332 ||  || — || November 1, 2007 || Kitt Peak || Spacewatch || AST || align=right | 2.3 km || 
|-id=333 bgcolor=#fefefe
| 294333 ||  || — || November 2, 2007 || Purple Mountain || PMO NEO || FLO || align=right data-sort-value="0.73" | 730 m || 
|-id=334 bgcolor=#E9E9E9
| 294334 ||  || — || November 3, 2007 || Kitt Peak || Spacewatch || GEF || align=right | 1.8 km || 
|-id=335 bgcolor=#d6d6d6
| 294335 ||  || — || November 4, 2007 || Mount Lemmon || Mount Lemmon Survey || THB || align=right | 4.2 km || 
|-id=336 bgcolor=#fefefe
| 294336 ||  || — || November 5, 2007 || La Sagra || OAM Obs. || — || align=right | 1.5 km || 
|-id=337 bgcolor=#E9E9E9
| 294337 ||  || — || November 7, 2007 || Mayhill || A. Lowe || — || align=right | 1.4 km || 
|-id=338 bgcolor=#E9E9E9
| 294338 ||  || — || November 3, 2007 || Catalina || CSS || JUN || align=right | 1.2 km || 
|-id=339 bgcolor=#E9E9E9
| 294339 ||  || — || November 8, 2007 || La Sagra || OAM Obs. || INO || align=right | 1.9 km || 
|-id=340 bgcolor=#fefefe
| 294340 ||  || — || November 2, 2007 || Socorro || LINEAR || — || align=right data-sort-value="0.84" | 840 m || 
|-id=341 bgcolor=#E9E9E9
| 294341 ||  || — || November 2, 2007 || Socorro || LINEAR || WIT || align=right | 1.4 km || 
|-id=342 bgcolor=#fefefe
| 294342 ||  || — || November 2, 2007 || Socorro || LINEAR || — || align=right | 1.1 km || 
|-id=343 bgcolor=#d6d6d6
| 294343 ||  || — || November 4, 2007 || Socorro || LINEAR || — || align=right | 4.0 km || 
|-id=344 bgcolor=#d6d6d6
| 294344 ||  || — || November 4, 2007 || Socorro || LINEAR || LIX || align=right | 4.6 km || 
|-id=345 bgcolor=#fefefe
| 294345 ||  || — || November 5, 2007 || Socorro || LINEAR || ERI || align=right | 2.0 km || 
|-id=346 bgcolor=#d6d6d6
| 294346 ||  || — || November 7, 2007 || La Sagra || OAM Obs. || EOS || align=right | 2.6 km || 
|-id=347 bgcolor=#E9E9E9
| 294347 ||  || — || November 7, 2007 || Calvin-Rehoboth || L. A. Molnar || RAF || align=right | 1.3 km || 
|-id=348 bgcolor=#d6d6d6
| 294348 ||  || — || November 3, 2007 || Kitt Peak || Spacewatch || — || align=right | 3.3 km || 
|-id=349 bgcolor=#FA8072
| 294349 ||  || — || November 2, 2007 || Socorro || LINEAR || — || align=right data-sort-value="0.95" | 950 m || 
|-id=350 bgcolor=#fefefe
| 294350 ||  || — || November 7, 2007 || Bisei SG Center || BATTeRS || — || align=right data-sort-value="0.68" | 680 m || 
|-id=351 bgcolor=#E9E9E9
| 294351 ||  || — || November 8, 2007 || Socorro || LINEAR || GEF || align=right | 1.7 km || 
|-id=352 bgcolor=#fefefe
| 294352 ||  || — || November 8, 2007 || Socorro || LINEAR || V || align=right data-sort-value="0.93" | 930 m || 
|-id=353 bgcolor=#E9E9E9
| 294353 ||  || — || November 8, 2007 || Socorro || LINEAR || — || align=right | 3.7 km || 
|-id=354 bgcolor=#d6d6d6
| 294354 ||  || — || November 9, 2007 || Calvin-Rehoboth || L. A. Molnar || — || align=right | 3.2 km || 
|-id=355 bgcolor=#d6d6d6
| 294355 ||  || — || November 3, 2007 || Kitt Peak || Spacewatch || — || align=right | 3.9 km || 
|-id=356 bgcolor=#E9E9E9
| 294356 ||  || — || November 1, 2007 || Kitt Peak || Spacewatch || WIT || align=right | 1.1 km || 
|-id=357 bgcolor=#fefefe
| 294357 ||  || — || November 2, 2007 || Kitt Peak || Spacewatch || FLO || align=right data-sort-value="0.83" | 830 m || 
|-id=358 bgcolor=#d6d6d6
| 294358 ||  || — || November 2, 2007 || Kitt Peak || Spacewatch || HYG || align=right | 3.3 km || 
|-id=359 bgcolor=#E9E9E9
| 294359 ||  || — || November 2, 2007 || Catalina || CSS || — || align=right | 2.1 km || 
|-id=360 bgcolor=#d6d6d6
| 294360 ||  || — || November 2, 2007 || Kitt Peak || Spacewatch || — || align=right | 3.6 km || 
|-id=361 bgcolor=#fefefe
| 294361 ||  || — || November 2, 2007 || Kitt Peak || Spacewatch || NYS || align=right data-sort-value="0.88" | 880 m || 
|-id=362 bgcolor=#d6d6d6
| 294362 ||  || — || November 2, 2007 || Purple Mountain || PMO NEO || — || align=right | 3.2 km || 
|-id=363 bgcolor=#fefefe
| 294363 ||  || — || November 3, 2007 || Kitt Peak || Spacewatch || — || align=right data-sort-value="0.74" | 740 m || 
|-id=364 bgcolor=#d6d6d6
| 294364 ||  || — || November 3, 2007 || Kitt Peak || Spacewatch || — || align=right | 2.5 km || 
|-id=365 bgcolor=#fefefe
| 294365 ||  || — || November 3, 2007 || Kitt Peak || Spacewatch || — || align=right data-sort-value="0.91" | 910 m || 
|-id=366 bgcolor=#E9E9E9
| 294366 ||  || — || November 3, 2007 || Kitt Peak || Spacewatch || — || align=right | 3.1 km || 
|-id=367 bgcolor=#d6d6d6
| 294367 ||  || — || November 3, 2007 || Kitt Peak || Spacewatch || — || align=right | 3.1 km || 
|-id=368 bgcolor=#fefefe
| 294368 ||  || — || November 3, 2007 || Kitt Peak || Spacewatch || — || align=right | 1.0 km || 
|-id=369 bgcolor=#d6d6d6
| 294369 ||  || — || November 3, 2007 || Kitt Peak || Spacewatch || — || align=right | 4.4 km || 
|-id=370 bgcolor=#d6d6d6
| 294370 ||  || — || November 4, 2007 || Kitt Peak || Spacewatch || — || align=right | 4.3 km || 
|-id=371 bgcolor=#E9E9E9
| 294371 ||  || — || November 5, 2007 || Mount Lemmon || Mount Lemmon Survey || — || align=right | 1.9 km || 
|-id=372 bgcolor=#d6d6d6
| 294372 ||  || — || November 5, 2007 || Mount Lemmon || Mount Lemmon Survey || KOR || align=right | 1.7 km || 
|-id=373 bgcolor=#fefefe
| 294373 ||  || — || November 5, 2007 || Mount Lemmon || Mount Lemmon Survey || MAS || align=right data-sort-value="0.97" | 970 m || 
|-id=374 bgcolor=#fefefe
| 294374 ||  || — || November 7, 2007 || Bisei SG Center || BATTeRS || FLO || align=right data-sort-value="0.74" | 740 m || 
|-id=375 bgcolor=#d6d6d6
| 294375 ||  || — || November 9, 2007 || 7300 || W. K. Y. Yeung || — || align=right | 3.8 km || 
|-id=376 bgcolor=#E9E9E9
| 294376 ||  || — || November 11, 2007 || Bisei SG Center || BATTeRS || MIS || align=right | 3.2 km || 
|-id=377 bgcolor=#d6d6d6
| 294377 ||  || — || November 2, 2007 || Mount Lemmon || Mount Lemmon Survey || — || align=right | 2.8 km || 
|-id=378 bgcolor=#d6d6d6
| 294378 ||  || — || November 2, 2007 || Mount Lemmon || Mount Lemmon Survey || KOR || align=right | 1.6 km || 
|-id=379 bgcolor=#d6d6d6
| 294379 ||  || — || November 3, 2007 || Mount Lemmon || Mount Lemmon Survey || — || align=right | 4.8 km || 
|-id=380 bgcolor=#d6d6d6
| 294380 ||  || — || November 4, 2007 || Mount Lemmon || Mount Lemmon Survey || KAR || align=right | 1.1 km || 
|-id=381 bgcolor=#E9E9E9
| 294381 ||  || — || November 4, 2007 || Kitt Peak || Spacewatch || — || align=right | 2.9 km || 
|-id=382 bgcolor=#d6d6d6
| 294382 ||  || — || November 4, 2007 || Kitt Peak || Spacewatch || K-2 || align=right | 1.6 km || 
|-id=383 bgcolor=#fefefe
| 294383 ||  || — || November 4, 2007 || Kitt Peak || Spacewatch || — || align=right data-sort-value="0.82" | 820 m || 
|-id=384 bgcolor=#d6d6d6
| 294384 ||  || — || November 4, 2007 || Kitt Peak || Spacewatch || — || align=right | 4.8 km || 
|-id=385 bgcolor=#fefefe
| 294385 ||  || — || November 5, 2007 || Purple Mountain || PMO NEO || — || align=right | 1.3 km || 
|-id=386 bgcolor=#E9E9E9
| 294386 ||  || — || November 7, 2007 || Catalina || CSS || — || align=right | 1.6 km || 
|-id=387 bgcolor=#fefefe
| 294387 ||  || — || November 7, 2007 || Catalina || CSS || — || align=right data-sort-value="0.88" | 880 m || 
|-id=388 bgcolor=#d6d6d6
| 294388 ||  || — || November 2, 2007 || Kitt Peak || Spacewatch || — || align=right | 4.6 km || 
|-id=389 bgcolor=#E9E9E9
| 294389 ||  || — || November 4, 2007 || Kitt Peak || Spacewatch || — || align=right | 1.8 km || 
|-id=390 bgcolor=#E9E9E9
| 294390 ||  || — || November 5, 2007 || Kitt Peak || Spacewatch || — || align=right | 2.3 km || 
|-id=391 bgcolor=#E9E9E9
| 294391 ||  || — || November 5, 2007 || Kitt Peak || Spacewatch || — || align=right | 1.6 km || 
|-id=392 bgcolor=#E9E9E9
| 294392 ||  || — || November 5, 2007 || Kitt Peak || Spacewatch || MRX || align=right | 1.3 km || 
|-id=393 bgcolor=#E9E9E9
| 294393 ||  || — || November 5, 2007 || Kitt Peak || Spacewatch || — || align=right | 2.7 km || 
|-id=394 bgcolor=#d6d6d6
| 294394 ||  || — || November 5, 2007 || Kitt Peak || Spacewatch || — || align=right | 2.7 km || 
|-id=395 bgcolor=#d6d6d6
| 294395 ||  || — || November 5, 2007 || Kitt Peak || Spacewatch || CHA || align=right | 2.7 km || 
|-id=396 bgcolor=#E9E9E9
| 294396 ||  || — || November 5, 2007 || Kitt Peak || Spacewatch || — || align=right | 2.1 km || 
|-id=397 bgcolor=#fefefe
| 294397 ||  || — || November 5, 2007 || Kitt Peak || Spacewatch || — || align=right data-sort-value="0.67" | 670 m || 
|-id=398 bgcolor=#E9E9E9
| 294398 ||  || — || November 5, 2007 || Kitt Peak || Spacewatch || — || align=right | 4.0 km || 
|-id=399 bgcolor=#d6d6d6
| 294399 ||  || — || November 6, 2007 || Kitt Peak || Spacewatch || — || align=right | 3.7 km || 
|-id=400 bgcolor=#E9E9E9
| 294400 ||  || — || November 8, 2007 || Catalina || CSS || — || align=right | 3.9 km || 
|}

294401–294500 

|-bgcolor=#E9E9E9
| 294401 ||  || — || November 11, 2007 || La Sagra || OAM Obs. || — || align=right | 1.2 km || 
|-id=402 bgcolor=#fefefe
| 294402 Joeorr ||  ||  || November 11, 2007 || Anderson Mesa || L. H. Wasserman || FLO || align=right data-sort-value="0.74" | 740 m || 
|-id=403 bgcolor=#fefefe
| 294403 ||  || — || November 14, 2007 || La Sagra || OAM Obs. || — || align=right data-sort-value="0.76" | 760 m || 
|-id=404 bgcolor=#fefefe
| 294404 ||  || — || November 4, 2007 || Mount Lemmon || Mount Lemmon Survey || — || align=right | 1.4 km || 
|-id=405 bgcolor=#d6d6d6
| 294405 ||  || — || November 4, 2007 || Mount Lemmon || Mount Lemmon Survey || EOS || align=right | 3.2 km || 
|-id=406 bgcolor=#fefefe
| 294406 ||  || — || November 4, 2007 || Mount Lemmon || Mount Lemmon Survey || — || align=right data-sort-value="0.82" | 820 m || 
|-id=407 bgcolor=#E9E9E9
| 294407 ||  || — || November 7, 2007 || Mount Lemmon || Mount Lemmon Survey || — || align=right | 2.1 km || 
|-id=408 bgcolor=#E9E9E9
| 294408 ||  || — || November 7, 2007 || Kitt Peak || Spacewatch || — || align=right | 2.2 km || 
|-id=409 bgcolor=#fefefe
| 294409 ||  || — || November 9, 2007 || Mount Lemmon || Mount Lemmon Survey || MAS || align=right | 1.0 km || 
|-id=410 bgcolor=#fefefe
| 294410 ||  || — || November 9, 2007 || Mount Lemmon || Mount Lemmon Survey || — || align=right data-sort-value="0.78" | 780 m || 
|-id=411 bgcolor=#fefefe
| 294411 ||  || — || November 9, 2007 || Kitt Peak || Spacewatch || — || align=right data-sort-value="0.96" | 960 m || 
|-id=412 bgcolor=#E9E9E9
| 294412 ||  || — || November 9, 2007 || Catalina || CSS || — || align=right | 1.9 km || 
|-id=413 bgcolor=#E9E9E9
| 294413 ||  || — || November 7, 2007 || Kitt Peak || Spacewatch || — || align=right | 1.8 km || 
|-id=414 bgcolor=#fefefe
| 294414 ||  || — || November 7, 2007 || Kitt Peak || Spacewatch || — || align=right data-sort-value="0.83" | 830 m || 
|-id=415 bgcolor=#d6d6d6
| 294415 ||  || — || November 9, 2007 || Kitt Peak || Spacewatch || — || align=right | 3.2 km || 
|-id=416 bgcolor=#E9E9E9
| 294416 ||  || — || November 9, 2007 || Kitt Peak || Spacewatch || — || align=right | 1.6 km || 
|-id=417 bgcolor=#d6d6d6
| 294417 ||  || — || November 9, 2007 || Kitt Peak || Spacewatch || — || align=right | 4.8 km || 
|-id=418 bgcolor=#d6d6d6
| 294418 ||  || — || November 9, 2007 || Kitt Peak || Spacewatch || — || align=right | 2.7 km || 
|-id=419 bgcolor=#E9E9E9
| 294419 ||  || — || November 9, 2007 || Kitt Peak || Spacewatch || MIS || align=right | 3.7 km || 
|-id=420 bgcolor=#E9E9E9
| 294420 ||  || — || November 9, 2007 || Kitt Peak || Spacewatch || — || align=right | 1.5 km || 
|-id=421 bgcolor=#E9E9E9
| 294421 ||  || — || November 14, 2007 || Bisei SG Center || BATTeRS || WIT || align=right | 1.3 km || 
|-id=422 bgcolor=#E9E9E9
| 294422 ||  || — || November 7, 2007 || Catalina || CSS || — || align=right | 2.8 km || 
|-id=423 bgcolor=#d6d6d6
| 294423 ||  || — || November 12, 2007 || Catalina || CSS || THM || align=right | 2.8 km || 
|-id=424 bgcolor=#E9E9E9
| 294424 ||  || — || November 7, 2007 || Kitt Peak || Spacewatch || AGN || align=right | 1.4 km || 
|-id=425 bgcolor=#E9E9E9
| 294425 ||  || — || November 7, 2007 || Kitt Peak || Spacewatch || — || align=right | 1.7 km || 
|-id=426 bgcolor=#d6d6d6
| 294426 ||  || — || November 9, 2007 || Kitt Peak || Spacewatch || KOR || align=right | 1.5 km || 
|-id=427 bgcolor=#d6d6d6
| 294427 ||  || — || November 11, 2007 || Mount Lemmon || Mount Lemmon Survey || KOR || align=right | 1.9 km || 
|-id=428 bgcolor=#E9E9E9
| 294428 ||  || — || November 13, 2007 || Dauban || Chante-Perdrix Obs. || PAD || align=right | 2.5 km || 
|-id=429 bgcolor=#d6d6d6
| 294429 ||  || — || November 15, 2007 || La Sagra || OAM Obs. || TEL || align=right | 1.8 km || 
|-id=430 bgcolor=#fefefe
| 294430 ||  || — || November 14, 2007 || Bisei SG Center || BATTeRS || FLO || align=right data-sort-value="0.76" | 760 m || 
|-id=431 bgcolor=#d6d6d6
| 294431 ||  || — || November 12, 2007 || Catalina || CSS || — || align=right | 3.3 km || 
|-id=432 bgcolor=#E9E9E9
| 294432 ||  || — || November 13, 2007 || Mount Lemmon || Mount Lemmon Survey || — || align=right | 3.1 km || 
|-id=433 bgcolor=#fefefe
| 294433 ||  || — || November 15, 2007 || Mount Lemmon || Mount Lemmon Survey || V || align=right data-sort-value="0.89" | 890 m || 
|-id=434 bgcolor=#E9E9E9
| 294434 ||  || — || November 13, 2007 || Mount Lemmon || Mount Lemmon Survey || — || align=right | 1.8 km || 
|-id=435 bgcolor=#fefefe
| 294435 ||  || — || November 13, 2007 || Kitt Peak || Spacewatch || FLO || align=right data-sort-value="0.62" | 620 m || 
|-id=436 bgcolor=#fefefe
| 294436 ||  || — || November 13, 2007 || Kitt Peak || Spacewatch || — || align=right data-sort-value="0.87" | 870 m || 
|-id=437 bgcolor=#d6d6d6
| 294437 ||  || — || November 13, 2007 || Cerro Burek || Alianza S4 Obs. || TIR || align=right | 2.9 km || 
|-id=438 bgcolor=#fefefe
| 294438 ||  || — || November 15, 2007 || Socorro || LINEAR || CIM || align=right | 3.0 km || 
|-id=439 bgcolor=#E9E9E9
| 294439 ||  || — || November 13, 2007 || Kitt Peak || Spacewatch || MIS || align=right | 3.2 km || 
|-id=440 bgcolor=#fefefe
| 294440 ||  || — || November 14, 2007 || Kitt Peak || Spacewatch || NYS || align=right data-sort-value="0.79" | 790 m || 
|-id=441 bgcolor=#E9E9E9
| 294441 ||  || — || November 14, 2007 || Kitt Peak || Spacewatch || EUN || align=right | 3.7 km || 
|-id=442 bgcolor=#fefefe
| 294442 ||  || — || November 14, 2007 || Kitt Peak || Spacewatch || MAS || align=right data-sort-value="0.87" | 870 m || 
|-id=443 bgcolor=#d6d6d6
| 294443 ||  || — || November 14, 2007 || Kitt Peak || Spacewatch || KOR || align=right | 1.6 km || 
|-id=444 bgcolor=#fefefe
| 294444 ||  || — || November 14, 2007 || Kitt Peak || Spacewatch || — || align=right data-sort-value="0.55" | 550 m || 
|-id=445 bgcolor=#d6d6d6
| 294445 ||  || — || November 14, 2007 || Kitt Peak || Spacewatch || EOS || align=right | 2.5 km || 
|-id=446 bgcolor=#E9E9E9
| 294446 ||  || — || November 15, 2007 || Catalina || CSS || INO || align=right | 1.2 km || 
|-id=447 bgcolor=#d6d6d6
| 294447 ||  || — || November 14, 2007 || Kitt Peak || Spacewatch || — || align=right | 4.6 km || 
|-id=448 bgcolor=#fefefe
| 294448 ||  || — || November 14, 2007 || Kitt Peak || Spacewatch || — || align=right data-sort-value="0.91" | 910 m || 
|-id=449 bgcolor=#d6d6d6
| 294449 ||  || — || November 14, 2007 || Kitt Peak || Spacewatch || — || align=right | 2.9 km || 
|-id=450 bgcolor=#E9E9E9
| 294450 ||  || — || November 15, 2007 || Anderson Mesa || LONEOS || — || align=right | 1.6 km || 
|-id=451 bgcolor=#d6d6d6
| 294451 ||  || — || November 15, 2007 || Mount Lemmon || Mount Lemmon Survey || — || align=right | 3.4 km || 
|-id=452 bgcolor=#E9E9E9
| 294452 ||  || — || November 11, 2007 || Catalina || CSS || EUN || align=right | 1.4 km || 
|-id=453 bgcolor=#E9E9E9
| 294453 ||  || — || November 12, 2007 || Catalina || CSS || — || align=right | 1.6 km || 
|-id=454 bgcolor=#E9E9E9
| 294454 ||  || — || November 3, 2007 || Catalina || CSS || — || align=right | 3.1 km || 
|-id=455 bgcolor=#d6d6d6
| 294455 ||  || — || November 9, 2007 || Mount Lemmon || Mount Lemmon Survey || — || align=right | 4.1 km || 
|-id=456 bgcolor=#E9E9E9
| 294456 ||  || — || November 2, 2007 || Catalina || CSS || — || align=right | 1.6 km || 
|-id=457 bgcolor=#E9E9E9
| 294457 ||  || — || November 7, 2007 || Kitt Peak || Spacewatch || RAF || align=right | 1.1 km || 
|-id=458 bgcolor=#E9E9E9
| 294458 ||  || — || November 7, 2007 || Kitt Peak || Spacewatch || — || align=right | 3.1 km || 
|-id=459 bgcolor=#E9E9E9
| 294459 ||  || — || November 11, 2007 || Mount Lemmon || Mount Lemmon Survey || AGN || align=right | 1.6 km || 
|-id=460 bgcolor=#E9E9E9
| 294460 ||  || — || November 14, 2007 || Kitt Peak || Spacewatch || — || align=right | 2.0 km || 
|-id=461 bgcolor=#fefefe
| 294461 ||  || — || November 3, 2007 || Kitt Peak || Spacewatch || — || align=right | 1.2 km || 
|-id=462 bgcolor=#E9E9E9
| 294462 ||  || — || November 6, 2007 || Kitt Peak || Spacewatch || — || align=right | 3.7 km || 
|-id=463 bgcolor=#fefefe
| 294463 ||  || — || November 2, 2007 || Kitt Peak || Spacewatch || NYS || align=right data-sort-value="0.78" | 780 m || 
|-id=464 bgcolor=#fefefe
| 294464 ||  || — || November 3, 2007 || Kitt Peak || Spacewatch || — || align=right data-sort-value="0.64" | 640 m || 
|-id=465 bgcolor=#fefefe
| 294465 ||  || — || November 5, 2007 || Mount Lemmon || Mount Lemmon Survey || — || align=right data-sort-value="0.78" | 780 m || 
|-id=466 bgcolor=#fefefe
| 294466 ||  || — || November 11, 2007 || Mount Lemmon || Mount Lemmon Survey || NYS || align=right data-sort-value="0.92" | 920 m || 
|-id=467 bgcolor=#E9E9E9
| 294467 ||  || — || November 3, 2007 || Mount Lemmon || Mount Lemmon Survey || — || align=right | 1.9 km || 
|-id=468 bgcolor=#d6d6d6
| 294468 ||  || — || November 3, 2007 || Kitt Peak || Spacewatch || KOR || align=right | 2.0 km || 
|-id=469 bgcolor=#E9E9E9
| 294469 ||  || — || November 5, 2007 || Kitt Peak || Spacewatch || — || align=right | 1.4 km || 
|-id=470 bgcolor=#E9E9E9
| 294470 ||  || — || November 6, 2007 || Kitt Peak || Spacewatch || — || align=right | 2.8 km || 
|-id=471 bgcolor=#d6d6d6
| 294471 ||  || — || November 8, 2007 || Socorro || LINEAR || — || align=right | 4.3 km || 
|-id=472 bgcolor=#d6d6d6
| 294472 ||  || — || November 2, 2007 || Kitt Peak || Spacewatch || — || align=right | 3.3 km || 
|-id=473 bgcolor=#d6d6d6
| 294473 ||  || — || November 3, 2007 || Kitt Peak || Spacewatch || TIR || align=right | 4.5 km || 
|-id=474 bgcolor=#fefefe
| 294474 ||  || — || November 5, 2007 || Mount Lemmon || Mount Lemmon Survey || FLO || align=right data-sort-value="0.81" | 810 m || 
|-id=475 bgcolor=#fefefe
| 294475 ||  || — || November 8, 2007 || Mount Lemmon || Mount Lemmon Survey || FLO || align=right data-sort-value="0.60" | 600 m || 
|-id=476 bgcolor=#E9E9E9
| 294476 ||  || — || November 9, 2007 || Socorro || LINEAR || — || align=right | 2.4 km || 
|-id=477 bgcolor=#d6d6d6
| 294477 ||  || — || November 9, 2007 || Kitt Peak || Spacewatch || — || align=right | 3.4 km || 
|-id=478 bgcolor=#E9E9E9
| 294478 ||  || — || November 16, 2007 || Mayhill || A. Lowe || RAF || align=right | 1.4 km || 
|-id=479 bgcolor=#d6d6d6
| 294479 ||  || — || November 17, 2007 || Bisei SG Center || BATTeRS || — || align=right | 3.3 km || 
|-id=480 bgcolor=#d6d6d6
| 294480 ||  || — || November 17, 2007 || Socorro || LINEAR || — || align=right | 4.0 km || 
|-id=481 bgcolor=#E9E9E9
| 294481 ||  || — || October 4, 2002 || Socorro || LINEAR || WIT || align=right | 1.5 km || 
|-id=482 bgcolor=#E9E9E9
| 294482 ||  || — || November 18, 2007 || Socorro || LINEAR || — || align=right | 1.8 km || 
|-id=483 bgcolor=#fefefe
| 294483 ||  || — || November 18, 2007 || Socorro || LINEAR || — || align=right data-sort-value="0.82" | 820 m || 
|-id=484 bgcolor=#E9E9E9
| 294484 ||  || — || November 18, 2007 || Socorro || LINEAR || PAD || align=right | 2.4 km || 
|-id=485 bgcolor=#E9E9E9
| 294485 ||  || — || November 18, 2007 || Socorro || LINEAR || ADE || align=right | 3.5 km || 
|-id=486 bgcolor=#E9E9E9
| 294486 ||  || — || November 18, 2007 || Socorro || LINEAR || — || align=right | 1.5 km || 
|-id=487 bgcolor=#E9E9E9
| 294487 ||  || — || November 17, 2007 || Catalina || CSS || — || align=right | 2.0 km || 
|-id=488 bgcolor=#E9E9E9
| 294488 ||  || — || November 17, 2007 || Bisei SG Center || BATTeRS || — || align=right | 2.4 km || 
|-id=489 bgcolor=#fefefe
| 294489 ||  || — || November 18, 2007 || Mount Lemmon || Mount Lemmon Survey || NYS || align=right data-sort-value="0.64" | 640 m || 
|-id=490 bgcolor=#fefefe
| 294490 ||  || — || November 18, 2007 || Mount Lemmon || Mount Lemmon Survey || — || align=right data-sort-value="0.71" | 710 m || 
|-id=491 bgcolor=#fefefe
| 294491 ||  || — || November 18, 2007 || Mount Lemmon || Mount Lemmon Survey || — || align=right data-sort-value="0.85" | 850 m || 
|-id=492 bgcolor=#E9E9E9
| 294492 ||  || — || November 18, 2007 || Mount Lemmon || Mount Lemmon Survey || — || align=right | 1.5 km || 
|-id=493 bgcolor=#E9E9E9
| 294493 ||  || — || November 18, 2007 || Mount Lemmon || Mount Lemmon Survey || — || align=right | 1.1 km || 
|-id=494 bgcolor=#fefefe
| 294494 ||  || — || November 18, 2007 || Mount Lemmon || Mount Lemmon Survey || V || align=right data-sort-value="0.91" | 910 m || 
|-id=495 bgcolor=#E9E9E9
| 294495 ||  || — || November 19, 2007 || Kitt Peak || Spacewatch || MRX || align=right | 1.3 km || 
|-id=496 bgcolor=#d6d6d6
| 294496 ||  || — || November 19, 2007 || Mount Lemmon || Mount Lemmon Survey || — || align=right | 3.3 km || 
|-id=497 bgcolor=#d6d6d6
| 294497 ||  || — || November 28, 2007 || Mayhill || A. Lowe || 3:2 || align=right | 4.8 km || 
|-id=498 bgcolor=#d6d6d6
| 294498 ||  || — || November 30, 2007 || Lulin Observatory || T.-C. Yang, Q.-z. Ye || Tj (2.98) || align=right | 6.2 km || 
|-id=499 bgcolor=#fefefe
| 294499 ||  || — || November 18, 2007 || Mount Lemmon || Mount Lemmon Survey || — || align=right | 1.0 km || 
|-id=500 bgcolor=#E9E9E9
| 294500 ||  || — || November 17, 2007 || Kitt Peak || Spacewatch || WIT || align=right | 1.3 km || 
|}

294501–294600 

|-bgcolor=#fefefe
| 294501 ||  || — || November 18, 2007 || Kitt Peak || Spacewatch || V || align=right data-sort-value="0.98" | 980 m || 
|-id=502 bgcolor=#fefefe
| 294502 ||  || — || November 19, 2007 || Mount Lemmon || Mount Lemmon Survey || — || align=right data-sort-value="0.91" | 910 m || 
|-id=503 bgcolor=#fefefe
| 294503 ||  || — || December 1, 2007 || Bisei SG Center || BATTeRS || FLO || align=right data-sort-value="0.89" | 890 m || 
|-id=504 bgcolor=#E9E9E9
| 294504 ||  || — || December 1, 2007 || Bisei SG Center || BATTeRS || — || align=right | 1.6 km || 
|-id=505 bgcolor=#fefefe
| 294505 ||  || — || December 1, 2007 || Bisei SG Center || BATTeRS || — || align=right data-sort-value="0.92" | 920 m || 
|-id=506 bgcolor=#fefefe
| 294506 ||  || — || December 2, 2007 || Lulin || LUSS || NYS || align=right data-sort-value="0.71" | 710 m || 
|-id=507 bgcolor=#d6d6d6
| 294507 ||  || — || December 3, 2007 || Kitt Peak || Spacewatch || — || align=right | 3.1 km || 
|-id=508 bgcolor=#d6d6d6
| 294508 ||  || — || December 1, 2007 || Lulin Observatory || LUSS || — || align=right | 4.3 km || 
|-id=509 bgcolor=#E9E9E9
| 294509 ||  || — || December 3, 2007 || Catalina || CSS || GEF || align=right | 1.7 km || 
|-id=510 bgcolor=#d6d6d6
| 294510 ||  || — || December 4, 2007 || Catalina || CSS || — || align=right | 4.5 km || 
|-id=511 bgcolor=#d6d6d6
| 294511 ||  || — || December 3, 2007 || Eskridge || G. Hug || — || align=right | 2.9 km || 
|-id=512 bgcolor=#fefefe
| 294512 ||  || — || December 5, 2007 || Pla D'Arguines || R. Ferrando || — || align=right data-sort-value="0.67" | 670 m || 
|-id=513 bgcolor=#E9E9E9
| 294513 ||  || — || December 4, 2007 || Anderson Mesa || LONEOS || MAR || align=right | 1.7 km || 
|-id=514 bgcolor=#E9E9E9
| 294514 ||  || — || December 5, 2007 || Kitt Peak || Spacewatch || — || align=right | 2.1 km || 
|-id=515 bgcolor=#d6d6d6
| 294515 ||  || — || December 5, 2007 || Kitt Peak || Spacewatch || — || align=right | 4.1 km || 
|-id=516 bgcolor=#fefefe
| 294516 ||  || — || December 8, 2007 || Bisei SG Center || BATTeRS || — || align=right data-sort-value="0.89" | 890 m || 
|-id=517 bgcolor=#fefefe
| 294517 ||  || — || December 8, 2007 || La Sagra || OAM Obs. || — || align=right data-sort-value="0.95" | 950 m || 
|-id=518 bgcolor=#fefefe
| 294518 ||  || — || December 6, 2007 || Catalina || CSS || H || align=right data-sort-value="0.82" | 820 m || 
|-id=519 bgcolor=#d6d6d6
| 294519 ||  || — || December 12, 2007 || Great Shefford || P. Birtwhistle || VER || align=right | 4.3 km || 
|-id=520 bgcolor=#d6d6d6
| 294520 ||  || — || December 12, 2007 || Socorro || LINEAR || EOS || align=right | 2.8 km || 
|-id=521 bgcolor=#fefefe
| 294521 ||  || — || December 13, 2007 || Socorro || LINEAR || — || align=right | 1.1 km || 
|-id=522 bgcolor=#d6d6d6
| 294522 ||  || — || December 15, 2007 || La Sagra || OAM Obs. || — || align=right | 4.7 km || 
|-id=523 bgcolor=#d6d6d6
| 294523 ||  || — || December 14, 2007 || Mount Lemmon || Mount Lemmon Survey || EOS || align=right | 2.5 km || 
|-id=524 bgcolor=#fefefe
| 294524 ||  || — || December 15, 2007 || Catalina || CSS || — || align=right data-sort-value="0.80" | 800 m || 
|-id=525 bgcolor=#fefefe
| 294525 ||  || — || December 15, 2007 || Catalina || CSS || FLO || align=right data-sort-value="0.89" | 890 m || 
|-id=526 bgcolor=#fefefe
| 294526 ||  || — || January 8, 2005 || Campo Imperatore || CINEOS || — || align=right data-sort-value="0.89" | 890 m || 
|-id=527 bgcolor=#E9E9E9
| 294527 ||  || — || December 15, 2007 || Catalina || CSS || — || align=right | 2.9 km || 
|-id=528 bgcolor=#d6d6d6
| 294528 ||  || — || December 15, 2007 || Catalina || CSS || EOS || align=right | 2.8 km || 
|-id=529 bgcolor=#fefefe
| 294529 ||  || — || December 15, 2007 || Mount Lemmon || Mount Lemmon Survey || — || align=right data-sort-value="0.70" | 700 m || 
|-id=530 bgcolor=#fefefe
| 294530 ||  || — || December 10, 2007 || Socorro || LINEAR || — || align=right | 1.2 km || 
|-id=531 bgcolor=#fefefe
| 294531 ||  || — || December 13, 2007 || Socorro || LINEAR || — || align=right | 1.0 km || 
|-id=532 bgcolor=#d6d6d6
| 294532 ||  || — || December 15, 2007 || Socorro || LINEAR || — || align=right | 3.6 km || 
|-id=533 bgcolor=#fefefe
| 294533 ||  || — || December 15, 2007 || Kitt Peak || Spacewatch || — || align=right | 1.0 km || 
|-id=534 bgcolor=#E9E9E9
| 294534 ||  || — || December 15, 2007 || Kitt Peak || Spacewatch || — || align=right | 1.3 km || 
|-id=535 bgcolor=#d6d6d6
| 294535 ||  || — || December 14, 2007 || Mount Lemmon || Mount Lemmon Survey || VER || align=right | 3.7 km || 
|-id=536 bgcolor=#fefefe
| 294536 ||  || — || December 4, 2007 || Mount Lemmon || Mount Lemmon Survey || V || align=right data-sort-value="0.88" | 880 m || 
|-id=537 bgcolor=#d6d6d6
| 294537 ||  || — || December 3, 2007 || Kitt Peak || Spacewatch || KOR || align=right | 1.6 km || 
|-id=538 bgcolor=#fefefe
| 294538 ||  || — || December 4, 2007 || Kitt Peak || Spacewatch || — || align=right data-sort-value="0.88" | 880 m || 
|-id=539 bgcolor=#E9E9E9
| 294539 ||  || — || December 4, 2007 || Kitt Peak || Spacewatch || — || align=right | 2.6 km || 
|-id=540 bgcolor=#d6d6d6
| 294540 ||  || — || December 5, 2007 || Kitt Peak || Spacewatch || EOS || align=right | 2.6 km || 
|-id=541 bgcolor=#d6d6d6
| 294541 ||  || — || December 15, 2007 || Mount Lemmon || Mount Lemmon Survey || — || align=right | 3.5 km || 
|-id=542 bgcolor=#fefefe
| 294542 || 2007 YU || — || December 16, 2007 || Bergisch Gladbach || W. Bickel || — || align=right data-sort-value="0.73" | 730 m || 
|-id=543 bgcolor=#E9E9E9
| 294543 ||  || — || December 18, 2007 || Vicques || M. Ory || — || align=right | 2.4 km || 
|-id=544 bgcolor=#fefefe
| 294544 ||  || — || January 15, 2001 || Kitt Peak || Spacewatch || NYS || align=right data-sort-value="0.96" | 960 m || 
|-id=545 bgcolor=#fefefe
| 294545 ||  || — || December 16, 2007 || Kitt Peak || Spacewatch || NYS || align=right data-sort-value="0.89" | 890 m || 
|-id=546 bgcolor=#E9E9E9
| 294546 ||  || — || December 16, 2007 || Anderson Mesa || LONEOS || GER || align=right | 2.1 km || 
|-id=547 bgcolor=#fefefe
| 294547 ||  || — || December 17, 2007 || Mount Lemmon || Mount Lemmon Survey || FLO || align=right data-sort-value="0.64" | 640 m || 
|-id=548 bgcolor=#E9E9E9
| 294548 ||  || — || December 17, 2007 || Mount Lemmon || Mount Lemmon Survey || — || align=right | 3.3 km || 
|-id=549 bgcolor=#fefefe
| 294549 ||  || — || December 16, 2007 || Kitt Peak || Spacewatch || — || align=right | 1.1 km || 
|-id=550 bgcolor=#d6d6d6
| 294550 ||  || — || December 16, 2007 || Kitt Peak || Spacewatch || VER || align=right | 3.4 km || 
|-id=551 bgcolor=#fefefe
| 294551 ||  || — || December 16, 2007 || Kitt Peak || Spacewatch || MAS || align=right data-sort-value="0.71" | 710 m || 
|-id=552 bgcolor=#E9E9E9
| 294552 ||  || — || December 16, 2007 || Anderson Mesa || LONEOS || — || align=right | 2.0 km || 
|-id=553 bgcolor=#d6d6d6
| 294553 ||  || — || December 18, 2007 || Mount Lemmon || Mount Lemmon Survey || — || align=right | 5.1 km || 
|-id=554 bgcolor=#d6d6d6
| 294554 ||  || — || December 18, 2007 || Mount Lemmon || Mount Lemmon Survey || EOS || align=right | 2.5 km || 
|-id=555 bgcolor=#d6d6d6
| 294555 ||  || — || December 19, 2007 || Kitt Peak || Spacewatch || — || align=right | 2.6 km || 
|-id=556 bgcolor=#E9E9E9
| 294556 ||  || — || December 28, 2007 || Kitt Peak || Spacewatch || — || align=right | 1.3 km || 
|-id=557 bgcolor=#fefefe
| 294557 ||  || — || December 28, 2007 || Kitt Peak || Spacewatch || — || align=right data-sort-value="0.89" | 890 m || 
|-id=558 bgcolor=#fefefe
| 294558 ||  || — || December 28, 2007 || Kitt Peak || Spacewatch || NYS || align=right data-sort-value="0.65" | 650 m || 
|-id=559 bgcolor=#fefefe
| 294559 ||  || — || December 28, 2007 || Kitt Peak || Spacewatch || — || align=right | 1.1 km || 
|-id=560 bgcolor=#d6d6d6
| 294560 ||  || — || December 30, 2007 || Mount Lemmon || Mount Lemmon Survey || — || align=right | 5.0 km || 
|-id=561 bgcolor=#fefefe
| 294561 ||  || — || December 30, 2007 || Kitt Peak || Spacewatch || — || align=right | 1.4 km || 
|-id=562 bgcolor=#fefefe
| 294562 ||  || — || December 30, 2007 || Catalina || CSS || — || align=right data-sort-value="0.99" | 990 m || 
|-id=563 bgcolor=#fefefe
| 294563 ||  || — || December 30, 2007 || Kitt Peak || Spacewatch || MAS || align=right data-sort-value="0.73" | 730 m || 
|-id=564 bgcolor=#E9E9E9
| 294564 ||  || — || December 30, 2007 || Mount Lemmon || Mount Lemmon Survey || HEN || align=right | 1.1 km || 
|-id=565 bgcolor=#fefefe
| 294565 ||  || — || December 30, 2007 || Kitt Peak || Spacewatch || CLA || align=right | 1.4 km || 
|-id=566 bgcolor=#E9E9E9
| 294566 ||  || — || December 30, 2007 || Kitt Peak || Spacewatch || — || align=right | 2.5 km || 
|-id=567 bgcolor=#d6d6d6
| 294567 ||  || — || December 30, 2007 || Kitt Peak || Spacewatch || — || align=right | 3.2 km || 
|-id=568 bgcolor=#E9E9E9
| 294568 ||  || — || December 29, 2007 || Great Shefford || P. Birtwhistle || AGN || align=right | 1.7 km || 
|-id=569 bgcolor=#fefefe
| 294569 ||  || — || December 28, 2007 || Kitt Peak || Spacewatch || — || align=right data-sort-value="0.91" | 910 m || 
|-id=570 bgcolor=#fefefe
| 294570 ||  || — || December 28, 2007 || Kitt Peak || Spacewatch || FLO || align=right data-sort-value="0.76" | 760 m || 
|-id=571 bgcolor=#E9E9E9
| 294571 ||  || — || December 28, 2007 || Kitt Peak || Spacewatch || — || align=right | 2.3 km || 
|-id=572 bgcolor=#E9E9E9
| 294572 ||  || — || December 28, 2007 || Kitt Peak || Spacewatch || HEN || align=right | 1.4 km || 
|-id=573 bgcolor=#d6d6d6
| 294573 ||  || — || December 28, 2007 || Kitt Peak || Spacewatch || EOS || align=right | 2.0 km || 
|-id=574 bgcolor=#E9E9E9
| 294574 ||  || — || December 30, 2007 || Kitt Peak || Spacewatch || — || align=right | 1.8 km || 
|-id=575 bgcolor=#fefefe
| 294575 ||  || — || December 30, 2007 || Kitt Peak || Spacewatch || MAS || align=right data-sort-value="0.62" | 620 m || 
|-id=576 bgcolor=#d6d6d6
| 294576 ||  || — || December 31, 2007 || Catalina || CSS || — || align=right | 4.2 km || 
|-id=577 bgcolor=#fefefe
| 294577 ||  || — || December 31, 2007 || Mount Lemmon || Mount Lemmon Survey || MAS || align=right data-sort-value="0.80" | 800 m || 
|-id=578 bgcolor=#fefefe
| 294578 ||  || — || December 31, 2007 || Bisei SG Center || BATTeRS || — || align=right data-sort-value="0.98" | 980 m || 
|-id=579 bgcolor=#E9E9E9
| 294579 ||  || — || December 30, 2007 || Kitt Peak || Spacewatch || — || align=right | 2.9 km || 
|-id=580 bgcolor=#d6d6d6
| 294580 ||  || — || December 18, 2007 || Catalina || CSS || — || align=right | 4.6 km || 
|-id=581 bgcolor=#E9E9E9
| 294581 ||  || — || December 18, 2007 || Mount Lemmon || Mount Lemmon Survey || NEM || align=right | 2.4 km || 
|-id=582 bgcolor=#d6d6d6
| 294582 ||  || — || December 30, 2007 || Kitt Peak || Spacewatch || EMA || align=right | 4.7 km || 
|-id=583 bgcolor=#d6d6d6
| 294583 ||  || — || December 31, 2007 || Kitt Peak || Spacewatch || — || align=right | 4.0 km || 
|-id=584 bgcolor=#fefefe
| 294584 ||  || — || December 31, 2007 || Kitt Peak || Spacewatch || — || align=right | 1.0 km || 
|-id=585 bgcolor=#E9E9E9
| 294585 ||  || — || December 30, 2007 || Mount Lemmon || Mount Lemmon Survey || — || align=right data-sort-value="0.95" | 950 m || 
|-id=586 bgcolor=#fefefe
| 294586 ||  || — || December 30, 2007 || Kitt Peak || Spacewatch || — || align=right data-sort-value="0.94" | 940 m || 
|-id=587 bgcolor=#d6d6d6
| 294587 ||  || — || December 16, 2007 || Kitt Peak || Spacewatch || — || align=right | 3.0 km || 
|-id=588 bgcolor=#d6d6d6
| 294588 ||  || — || December 30, 2007 || Kitt Peak || Spacewatch || EOS || align=right | 2.5 km || 
|-id=589 bgcolor=#E9E9E9
| 294589 ||  || — || December 31, 2007 || Kitt Peak || Spacewatch || AGN || align=right | 1.4 km || 
|-id=590 bgcolor=#E9E9E9
| 294590 ||  || — || December 16, 2007 || La Cañada || J. Lacruz || — || align=right | 1.6 km || 
|-id=591 bgcolor=#d6d6d6
| 294591 ||  || — || December 16, 2007 || Socorro || LINEAR || — || align=right | 4.0 km || 
|-id=592 bgcolor=#d6d6d6
| 294592 ||  || — || December 18, 2007 || Mount Lemmon || Mount Lemmon Survey || VER || align=right | 3.8 km || 
|-id=593 bgcolor=#d6d6d6
| 294593 ||  || — || December 18, 2007 || Mount Lemmon || Mount Lemmon Survey || — || align=right | 3.5 km || 
|-id=594 bgcolor=#d6d6d6
| 294594 ||  || — || December 18, 2007 || Mount Lemmon || Mount Lemmon Survey || — || align=right | 4.3 km || 
|-id=595 bgcolor=#d6d6d6
| 294595 Shingareva ||  ||  || January 6, 2008 || Zelenchukskaya || T. V. Kryachko || VER || align=right | 4.8 km || 
|-id=596 bgcolor=#d6d6d6
| 294596 ||  || — || January 8, 2008 || Dauban || F. Kugel || LUT || align=right | 7.4 km || 
|-id=597 bgcolor=#E9E9E9
| 294597 ||  || — || January 5, 2008 || Mayhill || A. Lowe || JUN || align=right | 4.0 km || 
|-id=598 bgcolor=#E9E9E9
| 294598 ||  || — || January 4, 2008 || Lulin || LUSS || — || align=right | 3.5 km || 
|-id=599 bgcolor=#d6d6d6
| 294599 ||  || — || January 5, 2008 || Purple Mountain || PMO NEO || — || align=right | 5.3 km || 
|-id=600 bgcolor=#d6d6d6
| 294600 Abedinabedin ||  ||  || January 7, 2008 || Lulin Observatory || Q.-z. Ye, C.-S. Lin || — || align=right | 3.9 km || 
|}

294601–294700 

|-bgcolor=#E9E9E9
| 294601 ||  || — || January 8, 2008 || Dauban || F. Kugel || — || align=right | 2.1 km || 
|-id=602 bgcolor=#E9E9E9
| 294602 ||  || — || January 10, 2008 || Mount Lemmon || Mount Lemmon Survey || HEN || align=right | 1.5 km || 
|-id=603 bgcolor=#fefefe
| 294603 ||  || — || January 10, 2008 || Kitt Peak || Spacewatch || V || align=right data-sort-value="0.63" | 630 m || 
|-id=604 bgcolor=#E9E9E9
| 294604 ||  || — || January 10, 2008 || Kitt Peak || Spacewatch || KON || align=right | 2.9 km || 
|-id=605 bgcolor=#E9E9E9
| 294605 ||  || — || January 10, 2008 || Mount Lemmon || Mount Lemmon Survey || — || align=right data-sort-value="0.97" | 970 m || 
|-id=606 bgcolor=#E9E9E9
| 294606 ||  || — || January 10, 2008 || Mount Lemmon || Mount Lemmon Survey || — || align=right | 1.2 km || 
|-id=607 bgcolor=#d6d6d6
| 294607 ||  || — || January 10, 2008 || Mount Lemmon || Mount Lemmon Survey || — || align=right | 2.6 km || 
|-id=608 bgcolor=#fefefe
| 294608 ||  || — || January 10, 2008 || Mount Lemmon || Mount Lemmon Survey || — || align=right data-sort-value="0.89" | 890 m || 
|-id=609 bgcolor=#E9E9E9
| 294609 ||  || — || January 10, 2008 || Kitt Peak || Spacewatch || — || align=right | 1.6 km || 
|-id=610 bgcolor=#E9E9E9
| 294610 ||  || — || January 10, 2008 || Kitt Peak || Spacewatch || — || align=right | 1.5 km || 
|-id=611 bgcolor=#fefefe
| 294611 ||  || — || January 10, 2008 || Mount Lemmon || Mount Lemmon Survey || — || align=right | 1.2 km || 
|-id=612 bgcolor=#fefefe
| 294612 ||  || — || January 10, 2008 || Mount Lemmon || Mount Lemmon Survey || — || align=right data-sort-value="0.83" | 830 m || 
|-id=613 bgcolor=#fefefe
| 294613 ||  || — || January 10, 2008 || Mount Lemmon || Mount Lemmon Survey || V || align=right data-sort-value="0.87" | 870 m || 
|-id=614 bgcolor=#fefefe
| 294614 ||  || — || January 10, 2008 || Mount Lemmon || Mount Lemmon Survey || — || align=right data-sort-value="0.80" | 800 m || 
|-id=615 bgcolor=#E9E9E9
| 294615 ||  || — || January 10, 2008 || Mount Lemmon || Mount Lemmon Survey || — || align=right | 2.7 km || 
|-id=616 bgcolor=#d6d6d6
| 294616 ||  || — || January 10, 2008 || Mount Lemmon || Mount Lemmon Survey || KOR || align=right | 1.6 km || 
|-id=617 bgcolor=#fefefe
| 294617 ||  || — || January 10, 2008 || Mount Lemmon || Mount Lemmon Survey || — || align=right data-sort-value="0.74" | 740 m || 
|-id=618 bgcolor=#fefefe
| 294618 ||  || — || January 10, 2008 || Desert Eagle || W. K. Y. Yeung || — || align=right | 1.1 km || 
|-id=619 bgcolor=#d6d6d6
| 294619 ||  || — || January 10, 2008 || Bergisch Gladbac || W. Bickel || EOS || align=right | 2.8 km || 
|-id=620 bgcolor=#d6d6d6
| 294620 ||  || — || January 12, 2008 || Bisei SG Center || BATTeRS || — || align=right | 3.8 km || 
|-id=621 bgcolor=#d6d6d6
| 294621 ||  || — || January 10, 2008 || Kitt Peak || Spacewatch || — || align=right | 4.0 km || 
|-id=622 bgcolor=#fefefe
| 294622 ||  || — || January 10, 2008 || Kitt Peak || Spacewatch || — || align=right data-sort-value="0.98" | 980 m || 
|-id=623 bgcolor=#fefefe
| 294623 ||  || — || January 10, 2008 || Kitt Peak || Spacewatch || — || align=right | 1.0 km || 
|-id=624 bgcolor=#fefefe
| 294624 ||  || — || January 10, 2008 || Kitt Peak || Spacewatch || — || align=right data-sort-value="0.62" | 620 m || 
|-id=625 bgcolor=#d6d6d6
| 294625 ||  || — || January 10, 2008 || Kitt Peak || Spacewatch || — || align=right | 2.3 km || 
|-id=626 bgcolor=#d6d6d6
| 294626 ||  || — || January 10, 2008 || Mount Lemmon || Mount Lemmon Survey || EOS || align=right | 3.8 km || 
|-id=627 bgcolor=#E9E9E9
| 294627 ||  || — || January 10, 2008 || Mount Lemmon || Mount Lemmon Survey || — || align=right | 1.2 km || 
|-id=628 bgcolor=#d6d6d6
| 294628 ||  || — || January 10, 2008 || Catalina || CSS || VER || align=right | 4.0 km || 
|-id=629 bgcolor=#fefefe
| 294629 ||  || — || January 10, 2008 || Catalina || CSS || — || align=right data-sort-value="0.77" | 770 m || 
|-id=630 bgcolor=#fefefe
| 294630 ||  || — || January 10, 2008 || Kitt Peak || Spacewatch || — || align=right data-sort-value="0.77" | 770 m || 
|-id=631 bgcolor=#E9E9E9
| 294631 ||  || — || January 10, 2008 || Kitt Peak || Spacewatch || MIS || align=right | 3.0 km || 
|-id=632 bgcolor=#d6d6d6
| 294632 ||  || — || January 10, 2008 || Lulin || LUSS || HYG || align=right | 3.2 km || 
|-id=633 bgcolor=#E9E9E9
| 294633 ||  || — || January 11, 2008 || Kitt Peak || Spacewatch || — || align=right | 1.4 km || 
|-id=634 bgcolor=#E9E9E9
| 294634 ||  || — || January 11, 2008 || Kitt Peak || Spacewatch || — || align=right | 2.5 km || 
|-id=635 bgcolor=#E9E9E9
| 294635 ||  || — || January 11, 2008 || Kitt Peak || Spacewatch || — || align=right | 2.9 km || 
|-id=636 bgcolor=#fefefe
| 294636 ||  || — || January 11, 2008 || Kitt Peak || Spacewatch || MAS || align=right data-sort-value="0.65" | 650 m || 
|-id=637 bgcolor=#E9E9E9
| 294637 ||  || — || January 11, 2008 || Kitt Peak || Spacewatch || — || align=right | 1.2 km || 
|-id=638 bgcolor=#E9E9E9
| 294638 ||  || — || January 11, 2008 || Kitt Peak || Spacewatch || — || align=right | 2.2 km || 
|-id=639 bgcolor=#E9E9E9
| 294639 ||  || — || January 11, 2008 || Kitt Peak || Spacewatch || — || align=right | 1.6 km || 
|-id=640 bgcolor=#fefefe
| 294640 ||  || — || January 11, 2008 || Kitt Peak || Spacewatch || V || align=right data-sort-value="0.70" | 700 m || 
|-id=641 bgcolor=#E9E9E9
| 294641 ||  || — || January 11, 2008 || Kitt Peak || Spacewatch || — || align=right | 2.9 km || 
|-id=642 bgcolor=#fefefe
| 294642 ||  || — || January 11, 2008 || Kitt Peak || Spacewatch || — || align=right data-sort-value="0.75" | 750 m || 
|-id=643 bgcolor=#d6d6d6
| 294643 ||  || — || January 11, 2008 || Kitt Peak || Spacewatch || — || align=right | 2.9 km || 
|-id=644 bgcolor=#d6d6d6
| 294644 ||  || — || January 11, 2008 || Kitt Peak || Spacewatch || — || align=right | 4.4 km || 
|-id=645 bgcolor=#E9E9E9
| 294645 ||  || — || January 11, 2008 || Mount Lemmon || Mount Lemmon Survey || — || align=right | 1.3 km || 
|-id=646 bgcolor=#E9E9E9
| 294646 ||  || — || January 11, 2008 || Kitt Peak || Spacewatch || AER || align=right | 1.5 km || 
|-id=647 bgcolor=#fefefe
| 294647 ||  || — || January 11, 2008 || Kitt Peak || Spacewatch || NYS || align=right data-sort-value="0.55" | 550 m || 
|-id=648 bgcolor=#d6d6d6
| 294648 ||  || — || January 13, 2008 || Kitt Peak || Spacewatch || VER || align=right | 5.3 km || 
|-id=649 bgcolor=#d6d6d6
| 294649 ||  || — || January 10, 2008 || Kitt Peak || Spacewatch || — || align=right | 3.1 km || 
|-id=650 bgcolor=#fefefe
| 294650 ||  || — || January 10, 2008 || Kitt Peak || Spacewatch || NYS || align=right data-sort-value="0.79" | 790 m || 
|-id=651 bgcolor=#E9E9E9
| 294651 ||  || — || January 10, 2008 || Kitt Peak || Spacewatch || AGN || align=right | 1.5 km || 
|-id=652 bgcolor=#E9E9E9
| 294652 ||  || — || January 11, 2008 || Kitt Peak || Spacewatch || HOF || align=right | 2.5 km || 
|-id=653 bgcolor=#E9E9E9
| 294653 ||  || — || January 12, 2008 || Kitt Peak || Spacewatch || NEM || align=right | 2.4 km || 
|-id=654 bgcolor=#fefefe
| 294654 ||  || — || January 12, 2008 || Kitt Peak || Spacewatch || — || align=right data-sort-value="0.68" | 680 m || 
|-id=655 bgcolor=#E9E9E9
| 294655 ||  || — || January 12, 2008 || Kitt Peak || Spacewatch || — || align=right | 1.9 km || 
|-id=656 bgcolor=#E9E9E9
| 294656 ||  || — || January 13, 2008 || Mount Lemmon || Mount Lemmon Survey || — || align=right | 2.0 km || 
|-id=657 bgcolor=#fefefe
| 294657 ||  || — || January 13, 2008 || Mount Lemmon || Mount Lemmon Survey || — || align=right data-sort-value="0.80" | 800 m || 
|-id=658 bgcolor=#d6d6d6
| 294658 ||  || — || January 14, 2008 || Kitt Peak || Spacewatch || — || align=right | 5.6 km || 
|-id=659 bgcolor=#d6d6d6
| 294659 ||  || — || January 15, 2008 || Mount Lemmon || Mount Lemmon Survey || — || align=right | 2.3 km || 
|-id=660 bgcolor=#d6d6d6
| 294660 ||  || — || January 12, 2008 || Bisei SG Center || BATTeRS || — || align=right | 4.8 km || 
|-id=661 bgcolor=#d6d6d6
| 294661 ||  || — || January 13, 2008 || Kitt Peak || Spacewatch || — || align=right | 4.1 km || 
|-id=662 bgcolor=#fefefe
| 294662 ||  || — || January 13, 2008 || Kitt Peak || Spacewatch || MAS || align=right data-sort-value="0.71" | 710 m || 
|-id=663 bgcolor=#E9E9E9
| 294663 ||  || — || January 13, 2008 || Kitt Peak || Spacewatch || AGN || align=right | 1.6 km || 
|-id=664 bgcolor=#d6d6d6
| 294664 Trakai ||  ||  || January 3, 2008 || Baldone || K. Černis, I. Eglītis || — || align=right | 3.9 km || 
|-id=665 bgcolor=#fefefe
| 294665 ||  || — || January 12, 2008 || Mount Lemmon || Mount Lemmon Survey || — || align=right data-sort-value="0.89" | 890 m || 
|-id=666 bgcolor=#E9E9E9
| 294666 ||  || — || January 13, 2008 || Kitt Peak || Spacewatch || NEM || align=right | 2.4 km || 
|-id=667 bgcolor=#d6d6d6
| 294667 ||  || — || January 13, 2008 || Kitt Peak || Spacewatch || EOS || align=right | 2.4 km || 
|-id=668 bgcolor=#fefefe
| 294668 ||  || — || January 14, 2008 || Kitt Peak || Spacewatch || NYS || align=right data-sort-value="0.73" | 730 m || 
|-id=669 bgcolor=#E9E9E9
| 294669 ||  || — || January 14, 2008 || Kitt Peak || Spacewatch || WIT || align=right | 1.5 km || 
|-id=670 bgcolor=#d6d6d6
| 294670 ||  || — || January 14, 2008 || Kitt Peak || Spacewatch || — || align=right | 3.8 km || 
|-id=671 bgcolor=#E9E9E9
| 294671 ||  || — || January 14, 2008 || Kitt Peak || Spacewatch || RAF || align=right | 1.4 km || 
|-id=672 bgcolor=#fefefe
| 294672 ||  || — || January 14, 2008 || Kitt Peak || Spacewatch || — || align=right data-sort-value="0.96" | 960 m || 
|-id=673 bgcolor=#E9E9E9
| 294673 ||  || — || January 12, 2008 || Kitt Peak || Spacewatch || AER || align=right | 1.5 km || 
|-id=674 bgcolor=#d6d6d6
| 294674 ||  || — || January 15, 2008 || Mount Lemmon || Mount Lemmon Survey || — || align=right | 4.5 km || 
|-id=675 bgcolor=#E9E9E9
| 294675 ||  || — || January 15, 2008 || Kitt Peak || Spacewatch || WIT || align=right | 1.4 km || 
|-id=676 bgcolor=#fefefe
| 294676 ||  || — || January 15, 2008 || Mount Lemmon || Mount Lemmon Survey || — || align=right data-sort-value="0.98" | 980 m || 
|-id=677 bgcolor=#fefefe
| 294677 ||  || — || January 15, 2008 || Mount Lemmon || Mount Lemmon Survey || — || align=right | 1.3 km || 
|-id=678 bgcolor=#fefefe
| 294678 ||  || — || January 15, 2008 || Mount Lemmon || Mount Lemmon Survey || — || align=right data-sort-value="0.83" | 830 m || 
|-id=679 bgcolor=#d6d6d6
| 294679 ||  || — || January 15, 2008 || Mount Lemmon || Mount Lemmon Survey || VER || align=right | 3.2 km || 
|-id=680 bgcolor=#E9E9E9
| 294680 ||  || — || January 15, 2008 || Kitt Peak || Spacewatch || — || align=right | 1.6 km || 
|-id=681 bgcolor=#E9E9E9
| 294681 ||  || — || January 15, 2008 || Kitt Peak || Spacewatch || — || align=right | 2.9 km || 
|-id=682 bgcolor=#d6d6d6
| 294682 ||  || — || January 15, 2008 || Kitt Peak || Spacewatch || — || align=right | 4.5 km || 
|-id=683 bgcolor=#E9E9E9
| 294683 ||  || — || January 15, 2008 || Kitt Peak || Spacewatch || — || align=right data-sort-value="0.97" | 970 m || 
|-id=684 bgcolor=#fefefe
| 294684 ||  || — || January 11, 2008 || Kitt Peak || Spacewatch || — || align=right data-sort-value="0.95" | 950 m || 
|-id=685 bgcolor=#d6d6d6
| 294685 ||  || — || January 11, 2008 || Kitt Peak || Spacewatch || 3:2 || align=right | 6.3 km || 
|-id=686 bgcolor=#E9E9E9
| 294686 ||  || — || January 11, 2008 || Mount Lemmon || Mount Lemmon Survey || — || align=right | 1.4 km || 
|-id=687 bgcolor=#E9E9E9
| 294687 ||  || — || January 11, 2008 || Kitt Peak || Spacewatch || — || align=right data-sort-value="0.94" | 940 m || 
|-id=688 bgcolor=#fefefe
| 294688 ||  || — || January 9, 2008 || Mount Lemmon || Mount Lemmon Survey || NYS || align=right data-sort-value="0.73" | 730 m || 
|-id=689 bgcolor=#d6d6d6
| 294689 ||  || — || January 10, 2008 || Mount Lemmon || Mount Lemmon Survey || — || align=right | 5.9 km || 
|-id=690 bgcolor=#fefefe
| 294690 ||  || — || January 12, 2008 || Kitt Peak || Spacewatch || — || align=right data-sort-value="0.70" | 700 m || 
|-id=691 bgcolor=#E9E9E9
| 294691 ||  || — || August 28, 2006 || Kitt Peak || Spacewatch || — || align=right | 2.5 km || 
|-id=692 bgcolor=#E9E9E9
| 294692 ||  || — || January 11, 2008 || Catalina || CSS || — || align=right | 1.6 km || 
|-id=693 bgcolor=#E9E9E9
| 294693 ||  || — || January 11, 2008 || Catalina || CSS || — || align=right | 3.7 km || 
|-id=694 bgcolor=#fefefe
| 294694 ||  || — || January 13, 2008 || Kitt Peak || Spacewatch || FLO || align=right data-sort-value="0.71" | 710 m || 
|-id=695 bgcolor=#fefefe
| 294695 ||  || — || January 10, 2008 || Mount Lemmon || Mount Lemmon Survey || — || align=right | 1.1 km || 
|-id=696 bgcolor=#E9E9E9
| 294696 ||  || — || January 16, 2008 || Mount Lemmon || Mount Lemmon Survey || — || align=right | 2.2 km || 
|-id=697 bgcolor=#d6d6d6
| 294697 ||  || — || January 16, 2008 || Kitt Peak || Spacewatch || — || align=right | 4.3 km || 
|-id=698 bgcolor=#FA8072
| 294698 ||  || — || January 18, 2008 || Pla D'Arguines || R. Ferrando || — || align=right data-sort-value="0.88" | 880 m || 
|-id=699 bgcolor=#E9E9E9
| 294699 ||  || — || January 16, 2008 || Kitt Peak || Spacewatch || — || align=right | 1.7 km || 
|-id=700 bgcolor=#E9E9E9
| 294700 ||  || — || January 16, 2008 || Kitt Peak || Spacewatch || — || align=right | 2.6 km || 
|}

294701–294800 

|-bgcolor=#fefefe
| 294701 ||  || — || January 16, 2008 || Kitt Peak || Spacewatch || FLO || align=right data-sort-value="0.57" | 570 m || 
|-id=702 bgcolor=#d6d6d6
| 294702 ||  || — || January 16, 2008 || Mount Lemmon || Mount Lemmon Survey || EOS || align=right | 6.0 km || 
|-id=703 bgcolor=#fefefe
| 294703 ||  || — || January 16, 2008 || Kitt Peak || Spacewatch || — || align=right data-sort-value="0.65" | 650 m || 
|-id=704 bgcolor=#fefefe
| 294704 ||  || — || January 16, 2008 || Kitt Peak || Spacewatch || — || align=right | 1.0 km || 
|-id=705 bgcolor=#fefefe
| 294705 ||  || — || January 29, 2008 || Wildberg || R. Apitzsch || MAS || align=right data-sort-value="0.78" | 780 m || 
|-id=706 bgcolor=#fefefe
| 294706 ||  || — || January 28, 2008 || Lulin || LUSS || — || align=right data-sort-value="0.70" | 700 m || 
|-id=707 bgcolor=#E9E9E9
| 294707 ||  || — || January 29, 2008 || La Sagra || OAM Obs. || — || align=right | 3.2 km || 
|-id=708 bgcolor=#d6d6d6
| 294708 ||  || — || January 29, 2008 || La Sagra || OAM Obs. || — || align=right | 5.1 km || 
|-id=709 bgcolor=#d6d6d6
| 294709 ||  || — || January 30, 2008 || Kitt Peak || Spacewatch || EOS || align=right | 2.3 km || 
|-id=710 bgcolor=#E9E9E9
| 294710 ||  || — || January 30, 2008 || Mount Lemmon || Mount Lemmon Survey || WIT || align=right | 1.3 km || 
|-id=711 bgcolor=#fefefe
| 294711 ||  || — || January 30, 2008 || Mount Lemmon || Mount Lemmon Survey || — || align=right data-sort-value="0.97" | 970 m || 
|-id=712 bgcolor=#fefefe
| 294712 ||  || — || January 30, 2008 || Mount Lemmon || Mount Lemmon Survey || NYS || align=right data-sort-value="0.78" | 780 m || 
|-id=713 bgcolor=#fefefe
| 294713 ||  || — || January 31, 2008 || Mount Lemmon || Mount Lemmon Survey || — || align=right data-sort-value="0.81" | 810 m || 
|-id=714 bgcolor=#E9E9E9
| 294714 ||  || — || January 31, 2008 || Mount Lemmon || Mount Lemmon Survey || — || align=right | 2.2 km || 
|-id=715 bgcolor=#E9E9E9
| 294715 ||  || — || January 30, 2008 || Kitt Peak || Spacewatch || BAR || align=right | 1.5 km || 
|-id=716 bgcolor=#d6d6d6
| 294716 ||  || — || January 30, 2008 || Catalina || CSS || — || align=right | 4.1 km || 
|-id=717 bgcolor=#fefefe
| 294717 ||  || — || January 30, 2008 || Mount Lemmon || Mount Lemmon Survey || — || align=right data-sort-value="0.77" | 770 m || 
|-id=718 bgcolor=#d6d6d6
| 294718 ||  || — || January 30, 2008 || Mount Lemmon || Mount Lemmon Survey || THM || align=right | 2.5 km || 
|-id=719 bgcolor=#E9E9E9
| 294719 ||  || — || January 30, 2008 || Mount Lemmon || Mount Lemmon Survey || HOF || align=right | 3.1 km || 
|-id=720 bgcolor=#E9E9E9
| 294720 ||  || — || January 30, 2008 || Catalina || CSS || — || align=right | 2.7 km || 
|-id=721 bgcolor=#d6d6d6
| 294721 ||  || — || January 30, 2008 || Mount Lemmon || Mount Lemmon Survey || HYG || align=right | 4.7 km || 
|-id=722 bgcolor=#E9E9E9
| 294722 ||  || — || January 30, 2008 || Kitt Peak || Spacewatch || — || align=right | 2.5 km || 
|-id=723 bgcolor=#d6d6d6
| 294723 ||  || — || January 31, 2008 || Catalina || CSS || EUP || align=right | 4.9 km || 
|-id=724 bgcolor=#d6d6d6
| 294724 ||  || — || January 31, 2008 || Mount Lemmon || Mount Lemmon Survey || — || align=right | 2.3 km || 
|-id=725 bgcolor=#E9E9E9
| 294725 ||  || — || January 30, 2008 || La Sagra || OAM Obs. || — || align=right | 4.5 km || 
|-id=726 bgcolor=#fefefe
| 294726 ||  || — || January 29, 2008 || La Sagra || OAM Obs. || — || align=right | 1.0 km || 
|-id=727 bgcolor=#d6d6d6
| 294727 Dennisritchie ||  ||  || January 31, 2008 || Jarnac || T. Glinos, D. H. Levy || — || align=right | 4.5 km || 
|-id=728 bgcolor=#fefefe
| 294728 ||  || — || January 31, 2008 || Catalina || CSS || V || align=right data-sort-value="0.78" | 780 m || 
|-id=729 bgcolor=#d6d6d6
| 294729 ||  || — || January 30, 2008 || Mount Lemmon || Mount Lemmon Survey || — || align=right | 2.9 km || 
|-id=730 bgcolor=#d6d6d6
| 294730 ||  || — || January 30, 2008 || Kitt Peak || Spacewatch || — || align=right | 3.0 km || 
|-id=731 bgcolor=#E9E9E9
| 294731 ||  || — || January 30, 2008 || Mount Lemmon || Mount Lemmon Survey || — || align=right | 3.0 km || 
|-id=732 bgcolor=#fefefe
| 294732 ||  || — || January 30, 2008 || Mount Lemmon || Mount Lemmon Survey || FLO || align=right data-sort-value="0.81" | 810 m || 
|-id=733 bgcolor=#E9E9E9
| 294733 ||  || — || January 19, 2008 || Kitt Peak || Spacewatch || INO || align=right | 1.5 km || 
|-id=734 bgcolor=#fefefe
| 294734 ||  || — || January 18, 2008 || Mount Lemmon || Mount Lemmon Survey || — || align=right | 2.1 km || 
|-id=735 bgcolor=#fefefe
| 294735 ||  || — || January 30, 2008 || Mount Lemmon || Mount Lemmon Survey || NYS || align=right data-sort-value="0.73" | 730 m || 
|-id=736 bgcolor=#E9E9E9
| 294736 ||  || — || January 30, 2008 || Mount Lemmon || Mount Lemmon Survey || — || align=right | 1.6 km || 
|-id=737 bgcolor=#d6d6d6
| 294737 ||  || — || January 30, 2008 || Mount Lemmon || Mount Lemmon Survey || K-2 || align=right | 1.7 km || 
|-id=738 bgcolor=#E9E9E9
| 294738 ||  || — || January 18, 2008 || Kitt Peak || Spacewatch || — || align=right | 2.9 km || 
|-id=739 bgcolor=#FFC2E0
| 294739 ||  || — || February 2, 2008 || Catalina || CSS || APO +1kmPHA || align=right | 1.4 km || 
|-id=740 bgcolor=#E9E9E9
| 294740 ||  || — || February 2, 2008 || Kitami || K. Endate || — || align=right | 1.7 km || 
|-id=741 bgcolor=#fefefe
| 294741 ||  || — || February 2, 2008 || Junk Bond || D. Healy || ERI || align=right | 1.8 km || 
|-id=742 bgcolor=#fefefe
| 294742 ||  || — || February 1, 2008 || Mount Lemmon || Mount Lemmon Survey || — || align=right data-sort-value="0.73" | 730 m || 
|-id=743 bgcolor=#d6d6d6
| 294743 ||  || — || February 2, 2008 || Mount Lemmon || Mount Lemmon Survey || — || align=right | 3.1 km || 
|-id=744 bgcolor=#d6d6d6
| 294744 ||  || — || February 3, 2008 || Socorro || LINEAR || 3:2 || align=right | 5.3 km || 
|-id=745 bgcolor=#E9E9E9
| 294745 ||  || — || February 2, 2008 || Mount Lemmon || Mount Lemmon Survey || — || align=right | 1.2 km || 
|-id=746 bgcolor=#E9E9E9
| 294746 ||  || — || February 2, 2008 || Kitt Peak || Spacewatch || — || align=right | 2.6 km || 
|-id=747 bgcolor=#E9E9E9
| 294747 ||  || — || February 2, 2008 || Mount Lemmon || Mount Lemmon Survey || — || align=right | 1.7 km || 
|-id=748 bgcolor=#E9E9E9
| 294748 ||  || — || February 3, 2008 || Kitt Peak || Spacewatch || — || align=right | 1.0 km || 
|-id=749 bgcolor=#fefefe
| 294749 ||  || — || February 3, 2008 || Kitt Peak || Spacewatch || — || align=right | 1.2 km || 
|-id=750 bgcolor=#fefefe
| 294750 ||  || — || February 3, 2008 || Kitt Peak || Spacewatch || — || align=right data-sort-value="0.90" | 900 m || 
|-id=751 bgcolor=#fefefe
| 294751 ||  || — || February 3, 2008 || Kitt Peak || Spacewatch || NYS || align=right data-sort-value="0.68" | 680 m || 
|-id=752 bgcolor=#fefefe
| 294752 ||  || — || February 3, 2008 || Kitt Peak || Spacewatch || — || align=right data-sort-value="0.90" | 900 m || 
|-id=753 bgcolor=#E9E9E9
| 294753 ||  || — || February 3, 2008 || Kitt Peak || Spacewatch || — || align=right data-sort-value="0.79" | 790 m || 
|-id=754 bgcolor=#d6d6d6
| 294754 ||  || — || February 3, 2008 || Kitt Peak || Spacewatch || — || align=right | 3.4 km || 
|-id=755 bgcolor=#E9E9E9
| 294755 ||  || — || February 3, 2008 || Kitt Peak || Spacewatch || MRX || align=right | 1.3 km || 
|-id=756 bgcolor=#E9E9E9
| 294756 ||  || — || February 3, 2008 || Kitt Peak || Spacewatch || NEM || align=right | 2.5 km || 
|-id=757 bgcolor=#d6d6d6
| 294757 ||  || — || February 6, 2008 || Anderson Mesa || LONEOS || — || align=right | 4.9 km || 
|-id=758 bgcolor=#fefefe
| 294758 ||  || — || February 7, 2008 || Socorro || LINEAR || KLI || align=right | 2.5 km || 
|-id=759 bgcolor=#fefefe
| 294759 ||  || — || February 1, 2008 || Kitt Peak || Spacewatch || NYS || align=right data-sort-value="0.72" | 720 m || 
|-id=760 bgcolor=#fefefe
| 294760 ||  || — || February 1, 2008 || Kitt Peak || Spacewatch || NYS || align=right data-sort-value="0.68" | 680 m || 
|-id=761 bgcolor=#fefefe
| 294761 ||  || — || February 1, 2008 || Kitt Peak || Spacewatch || — || align=right data-sort-value="0.94" | 940 m || 
|-id=762 bgcolor=#d6d6d6
| 294762 ||  || — || February 2, 2008 || Kitt Peak || Spacewatch || KOR || align=right | 1.7 km || 
|-id=763 bgcolor=#fefefe
| 294763 ||  || — || February 2, 2008 || Kitt Peak || Spacewatch || — || align=right | 1.1 km || 
|-id=764 bgcolor=#E9E9E9
| 294764 ||  || — || February 2, 2008 || Kitt Peak || Spacewatch || — || align=right | 3.0 km || 
|-id=765 bgcolor=#fefefe
| 294765 ||  || — || February 2, 2008 || Kitt Peak || Spacewatch || FLO || align=right data-sort-value="0.58" | 580 m || 
|-id=766 bgcolor=#E9E9E9
| 294766 ||  || — || February 2, 2008 || Kitt Peak || Spacewatch || — || align=right | 2.2 km || 
|-id=767 bgcolor=#d6d6d6
| 294767 ||  || — || February 2, 2008 || Kitt Peak || Spacewatch || THM || align=right | 2.9 km || 
|-id=768 bgcolor=#E9E9E9
| 294768 ||  || — || February 2, 2008 || Kitt Peak || Spacewatch || AST || align=right | 2.7 km || 
|-id=769 bgcolor=#fefefe
| 294769 ||  || — || February 2, 2008 || Kitt Peak || Spacewatch || NYS || align=right data-sort-value="0.82" | 820 m || 
|-id=770 bgcolor=#E9E9E9
| 294770 ||  || — || February 2, 2008 || Kitt Peak || Spacewatch || AST || align=right | 1.8 km || 
|-id=771 bgcolor=#d6d6d6
| 294771 ||  || — || February 2, 2008 || Kitt Peak || Spacewatch || — || align=right | 3.6 km || 
|-id=772 bgcolor=#fefefe
| 294772 ||  || — || February 2, 2008 || Kitt Peak || Spacewatch || V || align=right data-sort-value="0.64" | 640 m || 
|-id=773 bgcolor=#E9E9E9
| 294773 ||  || — || February 2, 2008 || Kitt Peak || Spacewatch || HOF || align=right | 2.8 km || 
|-id=774 bgcolor=#fefefe
| 294774 ||  || — || February 2, 2008 || Kitt Peak || Spacewatch || ERI || align=right | 1.7 km || 
|-id=775 bgcolor=#fefefe
| 294775 ||  || — || February 2, 2008 || Kitt Peak || Spacewatch || FLO || align=right data-sort-value="0.76" | 760 m || 
|-id=776 bgcolor=#fefefe
| 294776 ||  || — || February 2, 2008 || Kitt Peak || Spacewatch || — || align=right | 1.0 km || 
|-id=777 bgcolor=#E9E9E9
| 294777 ||  || — || February 2, 2008 || Kitt Peak || Spacewatch || WIT || align=right data-sort-value="0.92" | 920 m || 
|-id=778 bgcolor=#E9E9E9
| 294778 ||  || — || February 2, 2008 || Kitt Peak || Spacewatch || — || align=right | 2.5 km || 
|-id=779 bgcolor=#E9E9E9
| 294779 ||  || — || February 2, 2008 || Kitt Peak || Spacewatch || — || align=right | 2.4 km || 
|-id=780 bgcolor=#fefefe
| 294780 ||  || — || February 3, 2008 || Kitt Peak || Spacewatch || — || align=right data-sort-value="0.68" | 680 m || 
|-id=781 bgcolor=#E9E9E9
| 294781 ||  || — || February 6, 2008 || Catalina || CSS || — || align=right | 1.9 km || 
|-id=782 bgcolor=#d6d6d6
| 294782 ||  || — || February 6, 2008 || Anderson Mesa || LONEOS || — || align=right | 2.6 km || 
|-id=783 bgcolor=#fefefe
| 294783 ||  || — || February 6, 2008 || Catalina || CSS || V || align=right data-sort-value="0.79" | 790 m || 
|-id=784 bgcolor=#d6d6d6
| 294784 ||  || — || February 6, 2008 || Catalina || CSS || HIL3:2 || align=right | 11 km || 
|-id=785 bgcolor=#fefefe
| 294785 ||  || — || February 6, 2008 || Catalina || CSS || NYS || align=right data-sort-value="0.73" | 730 m || 
|-id=786 bgcolor=#E9E9E9
| 294786 ||  || — || February 6, 2008 || Kanab || E. E. Sheridan || — || align=right | 1.6 km || 
|-id=787 bgcolor=#E9E9E9
| 294787 ||  || — || February 7, 2008 || Kitt Peak || Spacewatch || — || align=right data-sort-value="0.87" | 870 m || 
|-id=788 bgcolor=#d6d6d6
| 294788 ||  || — || February 7, 2008 || Kitt Peak || Spacewatch || — || align=right | 3.9 km || 
|-id=789 bgcolor=#fefefe
| 294789 ||  || — || February 7, 2008 || Mount Lemmon || Mount Lemmon Survey || FLO || align=right data-sort-value="0.68" | 680 m || 
|-id=790 bgcolor=#E9E9E9
| 294790 ||  || — || February 8, 2008 || Mount Lemmon || Mount Lemmon Survey || — || align=right | 2.8 km || 
|-id=791 bgcolor=#E9E9E9
| 294791 ||  || — || February 8, 2008 || Mount Lemmon || Mount Lemmon Survey || — || align=right | 1.5 km || 
|-id=792 bgcolor=#E9E9E9
| 294792 ||  || — || February 8, 2008 || Catalina || CSS || — || align=right | 2.8 km || 
|-id=793 bgcolor=#d6d6d6
| 294793 ||  || — || February 10, 2008 || Desert Moon || B. L. Stevens || EOS || align=right | 2.3 km || 
|-id=794 bgcolor=#fefefe
| 294794 ||  || — || February 3, 2008 || Socorro || LINEAR || NYS || align=right | 2.2 km || 
|-id=795 bgcolor=#d6d6d6
| 294795 ||  || — || February 9, 2008 || Catalina || CSS || — || align=right | 6.2 km || 
|-id=796 bgcolor=#fefefe
| 294796 ||  || — || February 9, 2008 || Socorro || LINEAR || V || align=right data-sort-value="0.95" | 950 m || 
|-id=797 bgcolor=#fefefe
| 294797 ||  || — || February 9, 2008 || Catalina || CSS || — || align=right | 1.1 km || 
|-id=798 bgcolor=#d6d6d6
| 294798 ||  || — || February 9, 2008 || Catalina || CSS || — || align=right | 4.0 km || 
|-id=799 bgcolor=#E9E9E9
| 294799 ||  || — || February 6, 2008 || Catalina || CSS || — || align=right | 2.8 km || 
|-id=800 bgcolor=#fefefe
| 294800 ||  || — || February 6, 2008 || Catalina || CSS || NYS || align=right data-sort-value="0.74" | 740 m || 
|}

294801–294900 

|-bgcolor=#d6d6d6
| 294801 ||  || — || February 7, 2008 || Kitt Peak || Spacewatch || KOR || align=right | 1.6 km || 
|-id=802 bgcolor=#E9E9E9
| 294802 ||  || — || February 7, 2008 || Kitt Peak || Spacewatch || HEN || align=right | 1.4 km || 
|-id=803 bgcolor=#E9E9E9
| 294803 ||  || — || February 7, 2008 || Mount Lemmon || Mount Lemmon Survey || — || align=right | 1.9 km || 
|-id=804 bgcolor=#E9E9E9
| 294804 ||  || — || February 7, 2008 || Mount Lemmon || Mount Lemmon Survey || AGN || align=right | 1.6 km || 
|-id=805 bgcolor=#d6d6d6
| 294805 ||  || — || February 7, 2008 || Mount Lemmon || Mount Lemmon Survey || — || align=right | 3.7 km || 
|-id=806 bgcolor=#d6d6d6
| 294806 ||  || — || February 7, 2008 || Mount Lemmon || Mount Lemmon Survey || — || align=right | 5.0 km || 
|-id=807 bgcolor=#E9E9E9
| 294807 ||  || — || February 8, 2008 || Kitt Peak || Spacewatch || AGN || align=right | 1.6 km || 
|-id=808 bgcolor=#d6d6d6
| 294808 ||  || — || February 8, 2008 || Mount Lemmon || Mount Lemmon Survey || — || align=right | 3.3 km || 
|-id=809 bgcolor=#fefefe
| 294809 ||  || — || February 8, 2008 || Mount Lemmon || Mount Lemmon Survey || — || align=right data-sort-value="0.90" | 900 m || 
|-id=810 bgcolor=#fefefe
| 294810 ||  || — || February 8, 2008 || Mount Lemmon || Mount Lemmon Survey || — || align=right data-sort-value="0.82" | 820 m || 
|-id=811 bgcolor=#E9E9E9
| 294811 ||  || — || February 9, 2008 || Kitt Peak || Spacewatch || ADE || align=right | 2.4 km || 
|-id=812 bgcolor=#fefefe
| 294812 ||  || — || February 9, 2008 || Catalina || CSS || ERI || align=right | 1.9 km || 
|-id=813 bgcolor=#d6d6d6
| 294813 ||  || — || February 9, 2008 || Kitt Peak || Spacewatch || — || align=right | 3.7 km || 
|-id=814 bgcolor=#fefefe
| 294814 Nataliakidalova ||  ||  || February 11, 2008 || Andrushivka || Andrushivka Obs. || — || align=right | 1.3 km || 
|-id=815 bgcolor=#fefefe
| 294815 ||  || — || November 19, 2003 || Kitt Peak || Spacewatch || — || align=right data-sort-value="0.92" | 920 m || 
|-id=816 bgcolor=#fefefe
| 294816 ||  || — || February 14, 2008 || Grove Creek || F. Tozzi || — || align=right | 3.0 km || 
|-id=817 bgcolor=#d6d6d6
| 294817 ||  || — || February 6, 2008 || Catalina || CSS || EOS || align=right | 2.6 km || 
|-id=818 bgcolor=#fefefe
| 294818 ||  || — || February 7, 2008 || Kitt Peak || Spacewatch || — || align=right data-sort-value="0.94" | 940 m || 
|-id=819 bgcolor=#fefefe
| 294819 ||  || — || February 7, 2008 || Mount Lemmon || Mount Lemmon Survey || — || align=right | 1.1 km || 
|-id=820 bgcolor=#E9E9E9
| 294820 ||  || — || February 8, 2008 || Mount Lemmon || Mount Lemmon Survey || HOF || align=right | 3.3 km || 
|-id=821 bgcolor=#fefefe
| 294821 ||  || — || February 8, 2008 || Kitt Peak || Spacewatch || NYS || align=right data-sort-value="0.91" | 910 m || 
|-id=822 bgcolor=#fefefe
| 294822 ||  || — || February 8, 2008 || Kitt Peak || Spacewatch || NYS || align=right data-sort-value="0.79" | 790 m || 
|-id=823 bgcolor=#fefefe
| 294823 ||  || — || February 8, 2008 || Kitt Peak || Spacewatch || — || align=right data-sort-value="0.71" | 710 m || 
|-id=824 bgcolor=#fefefe
| 294824 ||  || — || February 8, 2008 || Mount Lemmon || Mount Lemmon Survey || FLO || align=right data-sort-value="0.75" | 750 m || 
|-id=825 bgcolor=#E9E9E9
| 294825 ||  || — || February 8, 2008 || Kitt Peak || Spacewatch || — || align=right data-sort-value="0.94" | 940 m || 
|-id=826 bgcolor=#fefefe
| 294826 ||  || — || February 8, 2008 || Mount Lemmon || Mount Lemmon Survey || — || align=right data-sort-value="0.70" | 700 m || 
|-id=827 bgcolor=#fefefe
| 294827 ||  || — || February 8, 2008 || Kitt Peak || Spacewatch || — || align=right data-sort-value="0.73" | 730 m || 
|-id=828 bgcolor=#fefefe
| 294828 ||  || — || February 8, 2008 || Kitt Peak || Spacewatch || NYS || align=right data-sort-value="0.76" | 760 m || 
|-id=829 bgcolor=#d6d6d6
| 294829 ||  || — || February 8, 2008 || Kitt Peak || Spacewatch || — || align=right | 7.0 km || 
|-id=830 bgcolor=#E9E9E9
| 294830 ||  || — || February 8, 2008 || Kitt Peak || Spacewatch || — || align=right | 1.3 km || 
|-id=831 bgcolor=#d6d6d6
| 294831 ||  || — || February 8, 2008 || Kitt Peak || Spacewatch || — || align=right | 5.2 km || 
|-id=832 bgcolor=#E9E9E9
| 294832 ||  || — || February 8, 2008 || Kitt Peak || Spacewatch || — || align=right | 1.4 km || 
|-id=833 bgcolor=#E9E9E9
| 294833 ||  || — || February 9, 2008 || Kitt Peak || Spacewatch || HOF || align=right | 2.2 km || 
|-id=834 bgcolor=#d6d6d6
| 294834 ||  || — || February 9, 2008 || Kitt Peak || Spacewatch || EOS || align=right | 3.0 km || 
|-id=835 bgcolor=#E9E9E9
| 294835 ||  || — || February 9, 2008 || Kitt Peak || Spacewatch || DOR || align=right | 3.0 km || 
|-id=836 bgcolor=#E9E9E9
| 294836 ||  || — || February 9, 2008 || Kitt Peak || Spacewatch || — || align=right | 2.3 km || 
|-id=837 bgcolor=#d6d6d6
| 294837 ||  || — || February 9, 2008 || Kitt Peak || Spacewatch || — || align=right | 3.1 km || 
|-id=838 bgcolor=#d6d6d6
| 294838 ||  || — || February 9, 2008 || Kitt Peak || Spacewatch || — || align=right | 2.7 km || 
|-id=839 bgcolor=#E9E9E9
| 294839 ||  || — || February 9, 2008 || Kitt Peak || Spacewatch || — || align=right | 1.8 km || 
|-id=840 bgcolor=#d6d6d6
| 294840 ||  || — || February 9, 2008 || Kitt Peak || Spacewatch || — || align=right | 4.2 km || 
|-id=841 bgcolor=#d6d6d6
| 294841 ||  || — || February 9, 2008 || Mount Lemmon || Mount Lemmon Survey || — || align=right | 3.5 km || 
|-id=842 bgcolor=#d6d6d6
| 294842 ||  || — || February 9, 2008 || Kitt Peak || Spacewatch || — || align=right | 3.4 km || 
|-id=843 bgcolor=#d6d6d6
| 294843 ||  || — || February 10, 2008 || Kitt Peak || Spacewatch || — || align=right | 2.9 km || 
|-id=844 bgcolor=#E9E9E9
| 294844 ||  || — || February 10, 2008 || Kitt Peak || Spacewatch || — || align=right | 2.7 km || 
|-id=845 bgcolor=#d6d6d6
| 294845 ||  || — || February 10, 2008 || Kitt Peak || Spacewatch || HYG || align=right | 3.8 km || 
|-id=846 bgcolor=#fefefe
| 294846 ||  || — || February 11, 2008 || Mount Lemmon || Mount Lemmon Survey || — || align=right data-sort-value="0.96" | 960 m || 
|-id=847 bgcolor=#E9E9E9
| 294847 ||  || — || February 11, 2008 || Mount Lemmon || Mount Lemmon Survey || — || align=right | 1.3 km || 
|-id=848 bgcolor=#E9E9E9
| 294848 ||  || — || February 12, 2008 || Mount Lemmon || Mount Lemmon Survey || — || align=right | 2.6 km || 
|-id=849 bgcolor=#fefefe
| 294849 ||  || — || February 13, 2008 || Catalina || CSS || — || align=right data-sort-value="0.86" | 860 m || 
|-id=850 bgcolor=#fefefe
| 294850 ||  || — || February 9, 2008 || Socorro || LINEAR || V || align=right data-sort-value="0.87" | 870 m || 
|-id=851 bgcolor=#fefefe
| 294851 ||  || — || February 6, 2008 || Anderson Mesa || LONEOS || NYS || align=right data-sort-value="0.79" | 790 m || 
|-id=852 bgcolor=#fefefe
| 294852 ||  || — || February 11, 2008 || Mount Lemmon || Mount Lemmon Survey || — || align=right data-sort-value="0.87" | 870 m || 
|-id=853 bgcolor=#fefefe
| 294853 ||  || — || February 11, 2008 || Mount Lemmon || Mount Lemmon Survey || V || align=right data-sort-value="0.90" | 900 m || 
|-id=854 bgcolor=#E9E9E9
| 294854 ||  || — || February 6, 2008 || Catalina || CSS || INO || align=right | 1.6 km || 
|-id=855 bgcolor=#E9E9E9
| 294855 ||  || — || February 13, 2008 || Catalina || CSS || — || align=right | 3.3 km || 
|-id=856 bgcolor=#fefefe
| 294856 ||  || — || February 2, 2008 || Kitt Peak || Spacewatch || FLO || align=right data-sort-value="0.68" | 680 m || 
|-id=857 bgcolor=#fefefe
| 294857 ||  || — || February 8, 2008 || Kitt Peak || Spacewatch || — || align=right data-sort-value="0.67" | 670 m || 
|-id=858 bgcolor=#d6d6d6
| 294858 ||  || — || February 7, 2008 || Mount Lemmon || Mount Lemmon Survey || — || align=right | 3.2 km || 
|-id=859 bgcolor=#E9E9E9
| 294859 ||  || — || February 7, 2008 || Mount Lemmon || Mount Lemmon Survey || RAF || align=right | 1.3 km || 
|-id=860 bgcolor=#E9E9E9
| 294860 ||  || — || February 11, 2008 || Mount Lemmon || Mount Lemmon Survey || — || align=right | 2.3 km || 
|-id=861 bgcolor=#fefefe
| 294861 ||  || — || February 1, 2008 || Kitt Peak || Spacewatch || EUT || align=right data-sort-value="0.75" | 750 m || 
|-id=862 bgcolor=#fefefe
| 294862 ||  || — || February 13, 2008 || Mount Lemmon || Mount Lemmon Survey || MAS || align=right data-sort-value="0.90" | 900 m || 
|-id=863 bgcolor=#d6d6d6
| 294863 ||  || — || February 8, 2008 || Kitt Peak || Spacewatch || — || align=right | 4.0 km || 
|-id=864 bgcolor=#fefefe
| 294864 ||  || — || February 10, 2008 || Kitt Peak || Spacewatch || — || align=right data-sort-value="0.95" | 950 m || 
|-id=865 bgcolor=#fefefe
| 294865 ||  || — || February 12, 2008 || Mount Lemmon || Mount Lemmon Survey || V || align=right data-sort-value="0.82" | 820 m || 
|-id=866 bgcolor=#d6d6d6
| 294866 ||  || — || February 13, 2008 || Kitt Peak || Spacewatch || EOS || align=right | 2.0 km || 
|-id=867 bgcolor=#E9E9E9
| 294867 ||  || — || February 10, 2008 || Mount Lemmon || Mount Lemmon Survey || — || align=right | 1.4 km || 
|-id=868 bgcolor=#E9E9E9
| 294868 ||  || — || February 7, 2008 || Kitt Peak || Spacewatch || — || align=right | 3.2 km || 
|-id=869 bgcolor=#E9E9E9
| 294869 ||  || — || February 3, 2008 || Catalina || CSS || — || align=right | 2.3 km || 
|-id=870 bgcolor=#E9E9E9
| 294870 ||  || — || February 1, 2008 || Kitt Peak || Spacewatch || HOF || align=right | 2.6 km || 
|-id=871 bgcolor=#E9E9E9
| 294871 ||  || — || February 2, 2008 || Kitt Peak || Spacewatch || — || align=right | 1.6 km || 
|-id=872 bgcolor=#d6d6d6
| 294872 ||  || — || February 13, 2008 || Mount Lemmon || Mount Lemmon Survey || — || align=right | 3.2 km || 
|-id=873 bgcolor=#d6d6d6
| 294873 ||  || — || February 9, 2008 || Kitt Peak || Spacewatch || KOR || align=right | 1.7 km || 
|-id=874 bgcolor=#E9E9E9
| 294874 ||  || — || February 10, 2008 || Mount Lemmon || Mount Lemmon Survey || — || align=right | 2.8 km || 
|-id=875 bgcolor=#E9E9E9
| 294875 ||  || — || February 13, 2008 || Mount Lemmon || Mount Lemmon Survey || — || align=right | 2.5 km || 
|-id=876 bgcolor=#fefefe
| 294876 ||  || — || February 1, 2008 || Kitt Peak || Spacewatch || — || align=right data-sort-value="0.57" | 570 m || 
|-id=877 bgcolor=#d6d6d6
| 294877 ||  || — || February 1, 2008 || Socorro || LINEAR || 7:4* || align=right | 5.5 km || 
|-id=878 bgcolor=#fefefe
| 294878 ||  || — || February 6, 2008 || Catalina || CSS || — || align=right data-sort-value="0.96" | 960 m || 
|-id=879 bgcolor=#d6d6d6
| 294879 ||  || — || February 9, 2008 || Socorro || LINEAR || — || align=right | 4.0 km || 
|-id=880 bgcolor=#E9E9E9
| 294880 ||  || — || February 9, 2008 || Kitt Peak || Spacewatch || — || align=right | 1.2 km || 
|-id=881 bgcolor=#E9E9E9
| 294881 ||  || — || February 10, 2008 || Mount Lemmon || Mount Lemmon Survey || — || align=right | 2.5 km || 
|-id=882 bgcolor=#d6d6d6
| 294882 ||  || — || February 12, 2008 || Kitt Peak || Spacewatch || KOR || align=right | 1.6 km || 
|-id=883 bgcolor=#E9E9E9
| 294883 ||  || — || February 24, 2008 || Kitt Peak || Spacewatch || — || align=right data-sort-value="0.86" | 860 m || 
|-id=884 bgcolor=#fefefe
| 294884 ||  || — || February 24, 2008 || Kitt Peak || Spacewatch || — || align=right data-sort-value="0.78" | 780 m || 
|-id=885 bgcolor=#d6d6d6
| 294885 ||  || — || February 24, 2008 || Kitt Peak || Spacewatch || 615 || align=right | 1.4 km || 
|-id=886 bgcolor=#E9E9E9
| 294886 ||  || — || February 24, 2008 || Mount Lemmon || Mount Lemmon Survey || — || align=right | 2.2 km || 
|-id=887 bgcolor=#fefefe
| 294887 ||  || — || February 24, 2008 || Mount Lemmon || Mount Lemmon Survey || — || align=right data-sort-value="0.98" | 980 m || 
|-id=888 bgcolor=#d6d6d6
| 294888 ||  || — || February 24, 2008 || Mount Lemmon || Mount Lemmon Survey || — || align=right | 3.9 km || 
|-id=889 bgcolor=#E9E9E9
| 294889 ||  || — || February 24, 2008 || Kitt Peak || Spacewatch || — || align=right data-sort-value="0.85" | 850 m || 
|-id=890 bgcolor=#fefefe
| 294890 ||  || — || February 24, 2008 || Kitt Peak || Spacewatch || — || align=right | 1.2 km || 
|-id=891 bgcolor=#fefefe
| 294891 ||  || — || February 25, 2008 || Kitt Peak || Spacewatch || ERI || align=right | 1.9 km || 
|-id=892 bgcolor=#E9E9E9
| 294892 ||  || — || February 26, 2008 || Kitt Peak || Spacewatch || — || align=right data-sort-value="0.90" | 900 m || 
|-id=893 bgcolor=#E9E9E9
| 294893 ||  || — || February 26, 2008 || Mount Lemmon || Mount Lemmon Survey || — || align=right | 1.8 km || 
|-id=894 bgcolor=#E9E9E9
| 294894 ||  || — || February 26, 2008 || Mount Lemmon || Mount Lemmon Survey || — || align=right | 1.3 km || 
|-id=895 bgcolor=#d6d6d6
| 294895 ||  || — || February 26, 2008 || Mount Lemmon || Mount Lemmon Survey || THM || align=right | 2.9 km || 
|-id=896 bgcolor=#E9E9E9
| 294896 ||  || — || February 26, 2008 || Mount Lemmon || Mount Lemmon Survey || — || align=right | 2.2 km || 
|-id=897 bgcolor=#d6d6d6
| 294897 ||  || — || February 27, 2008 || Kitt Peak || Spacewatch || — || align=right | 3.2 km || 
|-id=898 bgcolor=#E9E9E9
| 294898 ||  || — || February 27, 2008 || Mount Lemmon || Mount Lemmon Survey || — || align=right | 1.1 km || 
|-id=899 bgcolor=#fefefe
| 294899 ||  || — || February 27, 2008 || Lulin || LUSS || — || align=right | 1.0 km || 
|-id=900 bgcolor=#E9E9E9
| 294900 ||  || — || February 28, 2008 || Mount Lemmon || Mount Lemmon Survey || HOF || align=right | 2.4 km || 
|}

294901–295000 

|-bgcolor=#d6d6d6
| 294901 ||  || — || February 29, 2008 || La Sagra || OAM Obs. || TIR || align=right | 3.7 km || 
|-id=902 bgcolor=#E9E9E9
| 294902 ||  || — || February 24, 2008 || Kitt Peak || Spacewatch || — || align=right | 1.9 km || 
|-id=903 bgcolor=#d6d6d6
| 294903 ||  || — || February 28, 2008 || Mount Lemmon || Mount Lemmon Survey || — || align=right | 4.7 km || 
|-id=904 bgcolor=#d6d6d6
| 294904 ||  || — || February 28, 2008 || Kitt Peak || Spacewatch || EUP || align=right | 5.3 km || 
|-id=905 bgcolor=#fefefe
| 294905 ||  || — || February 28, 2008 || Kitt Peak || Spacewatch || — || align=right | 1.1 km || 
|-id=906 bgcolor=#d6d6d6
| 294906 ||  || — || February 29, 2008 || Mount Lemmon || Mount Lemmon Survey || — || align=right | 4.4 km || 
|-id=907 bgcolor=#E9E9E9
| 294907 ||  || — || February 28, 2008 || Socorro || LINEAR || — || align=right | 1.3 km || 
|-id=908 bgcolor=#E9E9E9
| 294908 ||  || — || February 27, 2008 || Mount Lemmon || Mount Lemmon Survey || — || align=right | 1.8 km || 
|-id=909 bgcolor=#d6d6d6
| 294909 ||  || — || February 24, 2008 || Kitt Peak || Spacewatch || MEL || align=right | 3.7 km || 
|-id=910 bgcolor=#fefefe
| 294910 ||  || — || February 26, 2008 || Kitt Peak || Spacewatch || — || align=right data-sort-value="0.72" | 720 m || 
|-id=911 bgcolor=#d6d6d6
| 294911 ||  || — || February 26, 2008 || Kitt Peak || Spacewatch || VER || align=right | 3.2 km || 
|-id=912 bgcolor=#d6d6d6
| 294912 ||  || — || February 26, 2008 || Kitt Peak || Spacewatch || MEL || align=right | 5.4 km || 
|-id=913 bgcolor=#fefefe
| 294913 ||  || — || February 27, 2008 || Kitt Peak || Spacewatch || — || align=right data-sort-value="0.83" | 830 m || 
|-id=914 bgcolor=#fefefe
| 294914 ||  || — || February 27, 2008 || Kitt Peak || Spacewatch || FLO || align=right data-sort-value="0.85" | 850 m || 
|-id=915 bgcolor=#E9E9E9
| 294915 ||  || — || February 27, 2008 || Kitt Peak || Spacewatch || — || align=right | 1.0 km || 
|-id=916 bgcolor=#fefefe
| 294916 ||  || — || February 27, 2008 || Kitt Peak || Spacewatch || MAS || align=right data-sort-value="0.70" | 700 m || 
|-id=917 bgcolor=#E9E9E9
| 294917 ||  || — || August 24, 2005 || Palomar || NEAT || WIT || align=right | 1.4 km || 
|-id=918 bgcolor=#fefefe
| 294918 ||  || — || February 27, 2008 || Kitt Peak || Spacewatch || — || align=right data-sort-value="0.98" | 980 m || 
|-id=919 bgcolor=#E9E9E9
| 294919 ||  || — || February 27, 2008 || Mount Lemmon || Mount Lemmon Survey || — || align=right | 1.4 km || 
|-id=920 bgcolor=#E9E9E9
| 294920 ||  || — || February 27, 2008 || Kitt Peak || Spacewatch || GEF || align=right | 1.7 km || 
|-id=921 bgcolor=#d6d6d6
| 294921 ||  || — || February 27, 2008 || Mount Lemmon || Mount Lemmon Survey || — || align=right | 3.9 km || 
|-id=922 bgcolor=#fefefe
| 294922 ||  || — || February 27, 2008 || Mount Lemmon || Mount Lemmon Survey || — || align=right data-sort-value="0.93" | 930 m || 
|-id=923 bgcolor=#fefefe
| 294923 ||  || — || February 27, 2008 || Kitt Peak || Spacewatch || — || align=right data-sort-value="0.88" | 880 m || 
|-id=924 bgcolor=#d6d6d6
| 294924 ||  || — || February 27, 2008 || Mount Lemmon || Mount Lemmon Survey || KAR || align=right | 1.4 km || 
|-id=925 bgcolor=#fefefe
| 294925 ||  || — || February 27, 2008 || Mount Lemmon || Mount Lemmon Survey || — || align=right | 1.5 km || 
|-id=926 bgcolor=#d6d6d6
| 294926 ||  || — || February 27, 2008 || Mount Lemmon || Mount Lemmon Survey || — || align=right | 3.0 km || 
|-id=927 bgcolor=#fefefe
| 294927 ||  || — || February 27, 2008 || Mount Lemmon || Mount Lemmon Survey || ERI || align=right | 2.0 km || 
|-id=928 bgcolor=#fefefe
| 294928 ||  || — || February 27, 2008 || Kitt Peak || Spacewatch || — || align=right | 1.1 km || 
|-id=929 bgcolor=#d6d6d6
| 294929 ||  || — || February 28, 2008 || Kitt Peak || Spacewatch || — || align=right | 3.3 km || 
|-id=930 bgcolor=#d6d6d6
| 294930 ||  || — || February 28, 2008 || Kitt Peak || Spacewatch || — || align=right | 4.3 km || 
|-id=931 bgcolor=#d6d6d6
| 294931 ||  || — || February 28, 2008 || Mount Lemmon || Mount Lemmon Survey || THM || align=right | 2.3 km || 
|-id=932 bgcolor=#fefefe
| 294932 ||  || — || February 28, 2008 || Mount Lemmon || Mount Lemmon Survey || NYS || align=right data-sort-value="0.83" | 830 m || 
|-id=933 bgcolor=#d6d6d6
| 294933 ||  || — || February 29, 2008 || Catalina || CSS || EOS || align=right | 3.0 km || 
|-id=934 bgcolor=#d6d6d6
| 294934 ||  || — || February 29, 2008 || Catalina || CSS || — || align=right | 4.1 km || 
|-id=935 bgcolor=#E9E9E9
| 294935 ||  || — || February 29, 2008 || Mount Lemmon || Mount Lemmon Survey || — || align=right | 1.5 km || 
|-id=936 bgcolor=#d6d6d6
| 294936 ||  || — || February 29, 2008 || Mount Lemmon || Mount Lemmon Survey || ALA || align=right | 4.6 km || 
|-id=937 bgcolor=#E9E9E9
| 294937 ||  || — || February 27, 2008 || Catalina || CSS || — || align=right | 2.6 km || 
|-id=938 bgcolor=#fefefe
| 294938 ||  || — || February 29, 2008 || Catalina || CSS || — || align=right | 1.2 km || 
|-id=939 bgcolor=#fefefe
| 294939 ||  || — || February 26, 2008 || Mount Lemmon || Mount Lemmon Survey || MAS || align=right data-sort-value="0.85" | 850 m || 
|-id=940 bgcolor=#E9E9E9
| 294940 ||  || — || February 27, 2008 || Catalina || CSS || — || align=right | 1.5 km || 
|-id=941 bgcolor=#E9E9E9
| 294941 ||  || — || February 28, 2008 || Catalina || CSS || — || align=right | 4.4 km || 
|-id=942 bgcolor=#fefefe
| 294942 ||  || — || February 27, 2008 || Mount Lemmon || Mount Lemmon Survey || — || align=right data-sort-value="0.93" | 930 m || 
|-id=943 bgcolor=#d6d6d6
| 294943 ||  || — || February 28, 2008 || Kitt Peak || Spacewatch || EOS || align=right | 1.8 km || 
|-id=944 bgcolor=#d6d6d6
| 294944 ||  || — || February 28, 2008 || Mount Lemmon || Mount Lemmon Survey || EOS || align=right | 2.4 km || 
|-id=945 bgcolor=#fefefe
| 294945 ||  || — || February 29, 2008 || Kitt Peak || Spacewatch || — || align=right | 1.0 km || 
|-id=946 bgcolor=#fefefe
| 294946 ||  || — || February 29, 2008 || Kitt Peak || Spacewatch || — || align=right data-sort-value="0.75" | 750 m || 
|-id=947 bgcolor=#E9E9E9
| 294947 ||  || — || February 29, 2008 || Kitt Peak || Spacewatch || — || align=right | 1.4 km || 
|-id=948 bgcolor=#fefefe
| 294948 ||  || — || February 29, 2008 || Kitt Peak || Spacewatch || — || align=right | 1.1 km || 
|-id=949 bgcolor=#E9E9E9
| 294949 ||  || — || February 29, 2008 || Kitt Peak || Spacewatch || — || align=right | 1.8 km || 
|-id=950 bgcolor=#d6d6d6
| 294950 ||  || — || February 29, 2008 || Kitt Peak || Spacewatch || — || align=right | 3.8 km || 
|-id=951 bgcolor=#d6d6d6
| 294951 ||  || — || February 28, 2008 || Catalina || CSS || EOS || align=right | 2.9 km || 
|-id=952 bgcolor=#d6d6d6
| 294952 ||  || — || February 24, 2008 || Kitt Peak || Spacewatch || SYL7:4 || align=right | 5.6 km || 
|-id=953 bgcolor=#d6d6d6
| 294953 ||  || — || February 24, 2008 || Mount Lemmon || Mount Lemmon Survey || — || align=right | 3.4 km || 
|-id=954 bgcolor=#d6d6d6
| 294954 ||  || — || February 28, 2008 || Kitt Peak || Spacewatch || EUP || align=right | 4.2 km || 
|-id=955 bgcolor=#d6d6d6
| 294955 ||  || — || February 28, 2008 || Kitt Peak || Spacewatch || — || align=right | 3.4 km || 
|-id=956 bgcolor=#E9E9E9
| 294956 ||  || — || February 28, 2008 || Mount Lemmon || Mount Lemmon Survey || — || align=right | 1.2 km || 
|-id=957 bgcolor=#d6d6d6
| 294957 ||  || — || February 28, 2008 || Mount Lemmon || Mount Lemmon Survey || KOR || align=right | 1.4 km || 
|-id=958 bgcolor=#d6d6d6
| 294958 ||  || — || February 28, 2008 || Kitt Peak || Spacewatch || — || align=right | 2.5 km || 
|-id=959 bgcolor=#E9E9E9
| 294959 ||  || — || February 29, 2008 || Kitt Peak || Spacewatch || — || align=right | 3.1 km || 
|-id=960 bgcolor=#d6d6d6
| 294960 ||  || — || February 28, 2008 || Mount Lemmon || Mount Lemmon Survey || — || align=right | 4.0 km || 
|-id=961 bgcolor=#E9E9E9
| 294961 ||  || — || February 27, 2008 || Kitt Peak || Spacewatch || NEM || align=right | 2.5 km || 
|-id=962 bgcolor=#d6d6d6
| 294962 ||  || — || February 28, 2008 || Mount Lemmon || Mount Lemmon Survey || — || align=right | 4.3 km || 
|-id=963 bgcolor=#E9E9E9
| 294963 ||  || — || February 28, 2008 || Kitt Peak || Spacewatch || — || align=right | 2.9 km || 
|-id=964 bgcolor=#E9E9E9
| 294964 ||  || — || February 27, 2008 || Mount Lemmon || Mount Lemmon Survey || — || align=right data-sort-value="0.87" | 870 m || 
|-id=965 bgcolor=#E9E9E9
| 294965 ||  || — || February 27, 2008 || Mount Lemmon || Mount Lemmon Survey || — || align=right | 2.5 km || 
|-id=966 bgcolor=#E9E9E9
| 294966 ||  || — || March 2, 2008 || Grove Creek || F. Tozzi || MIT || align=right | 3.6 km || 
|-id=967 bgcolor=#E9E9E9
| 294967 ||  || — || March 1, 2008 || Mount Lemmon || Mount Lemmon Survey || HNS || align=right | 1.3 km || 
|-id=968 bgcolor=#fefefe
| 294968 ||  || — || March 1, 2008 || Mount Lemmon || Mount Lemmon Survey || FLO || align=right data-sort-value="0.83" | 830 m || 
|-id=969 bgcolor=#E9E9E9
| 294969 ||  || — || July 1, 2005 || Kitt Peak || Spacewatch || PAD || align=right | 2.0 km || 
|-id=970 bgcolor=#E9E9E9
| 294970 ||  || — || March 2, 2008 || Kitt Peak || Spacewatch || RAF || align=right | 1.2 km || 
|-id=971 bgcolor=#fefefe
| 294971 ||  || — || March 2, 2008 || Kitt Peak || Spacewatch || MAS || align=right data-sort-value="0.82" | 820 m || 
|-id=972 bgcolor=#E9E9E9
| 294972 ||  || — || March 3, 2008 || Catalina || CSS || — || align=right | 1.0 km || 
|-id=973 bgcolor=#E9E9E9
| 294973 ||  || — || March 3, 2008 || Dauban || F. Kugel || — || align=right | 1.8 km || 
|-id=974 bgcolor=#E9E9E9
| 294974 ||  || — || March 1, 2008 || Kitt Peak || Spacewatch || — || align=right | 1.8 km || 
|-id=975 bgcolor=#E9E9E9
| 294975 ||  || — || March 1, 2008 || Kitt Peak || Spacewatch || — || align=right | 1.1 km || 
|-id=976 bgcolor=#E9E9E9
| 294976 ||  || — || March 1, 2008 || Kitt Peak || Spacewatch || — || align=right | 1.9 km || 
|-id=977 bgcolor=#d6d6d6
| 294977 ||  || — || March 1, 2008 || Kitt Peak || Spacewatch || — || align=right | 6.3 km || 
|-id=978 bgcolor=#E9E9E9
| 294978 ||  || — || March 1, 2008 || Kitt Peak || Spacewatch || — || align=right | 1.3 km || 
|-id=979 bgcolor=#fefefe
| 294979 ||  || — || March 1, 2008 || Kitt Peak || Spacewatch || NYS || align=right data-sort-value="0.79" | 790 m || 
|-id=980 bgcolor=#E9E9E9
| 294980 ||  || — || March 1, 2008 || Kitt Peak || Spacewatch || NEM || align=right | 2.4 km || 
|-id=981 bgcolor=#E9E9E9
| 294981 ||  || — || March 1, 2008 || Kitt Peak || Spacewatch || — || align=right | 2.1 km || 
|-id=982 bgcolor=#fefefe
| 294982 ||  || — || March 1, 2008 || Kitt Peak || Spacewatch || EUT || align=right data-sort-value="0.66" | 660 m || 
|-id=983 bgcolor=#E9E9E9
| 294983 ||  || — || March 1, 2008 || Kitt Peak || Spacewatch || HEN || align=right | 1.1 km || 
|-id=984 bgcolor=#d6d6d6
| 294984 ||  || — || March 1, 2008 || Kitt Peak || Spacewatch || — || align=right | 3.4 km || 
|-id=985 bgcolor=#fefefe
| 294985 ||  || — || March 2, 2008 || Kitt Peak || Spacewatch || — || align=right data-sort-value="0.90" | 900 m || 
|-id=986 bgcolor=#d6d6d6
| 294986 ||  || — || March 2, 2008 || Kitt Peak || Spacewatch || EOS || align=right | 2.5 km || 
|-id=987 bgcolor=#fefefe
| 294987 ||  || — || March 2, 2008 || Kitt Peak || Spacewatch || NYS || align=right data-sort-value="0.65" | 650 m || 
|-id=988 bgcolor=#E9E9E9
| 294988 ||  || — || March 2, 2008 || Kitt Peak || Spacewatch || — || align=right | 2.4 km || 
|-id=989 bgcolor=#E9E9E9
| 294989 ||  || — || March 2, 2008 || Kitt Peak || Spacewatch || NEM || align=right | 2.8 km || 
|-id=990 bgcolor=#d6d6d6
| 294990 ||  || — || March 2, 2008 || Mount Lemmon || Mount Lemmon Survey || TRP || align=right | 3.7 km || 
|-id=991 bgcolor=#fefefe
| 294991 ||  || — || March 3, 2008 || Catalina || CSS || V || align=right data-sort-value="0.79" | 790 m || 
|-id=992 bgcolor=#d6d6d6
| 294992 ||  || — || March 3, 2008 || Catalina || CSS || — || align=right | 3.3 km || 
|-id=993 bgcolor=#E9E9E9
| 294993 ||  || — || March 4, 2008 || Catalina || CSS || — || align=right | 3.9 km || 
|-id=994 bgcolor=#d6d6d6
| 294994 ||  || — || March 4, 2008 || Mount Lemmon || Mount Lemmon Survey || — || align=right | 5.4 km || 
|-id=995 bgcolor=#E9E9E9
| 294995 ||  || — || March 1, 2008 || Kitt Peak || Spacewatch || — || align=right | 1.7 km || 
|-id=996 bgcolor=#fefefe
| 294996 ||  || — || March 1, 2008 || Kitt Peak || Spacewatch || — || align=right data-sort-value="0.91" | 910 m || 
|-id=997 bgcolor=#fefefe
| 294997 ||  || — || March 1, 2008 || Kitt Peak || Spacewatch || FLO || align=right data-sort-value="0.80" | 800 m || 
|-id=998 bgcolor=#E9E9E9
| 294998 ||  || — || March 2, 2008 || Mount Lemmon || Mount Lemmon Survey || — || align=right | 2.5 km || 
|-id=999 bgcolor=#E9E9E9
| 294999 ||  || — || March 3, 2008 || Kitt Peak || Spacewatch || — || align=right | 1.8 km || 
|-id=000 bgcolor=#fefefe
| 295000 ||  || — || March 3, 2008 || Kitt Peak || Spacewatch || NYS || align=right | 1.1 km || 
|}

References

External links 
 Discovery Circumstances: Numbered Minor Planets (290001)–(295000) (IAU Minor Planet Center)

0294